= Slovenian Parliament =

Bicameral legislature of Slovenia

Coordinates: 46°03′06″N 14°30′04″E

Slovenian Parliament Slovenski parlament

Type
- Type: Bicameral
- Houses: • National Assembly • National Council

History
- Founded: 25 June 1991; 35 years ago
- Preceded by: Parliament of Yugoslavia

Leadership
- President of the National Council: Marko Lotrič
- Speaker of the National Assembly: Zoran Stevanović
- Seats: National Assembly: 90; National Council: 40

Elections
- Last National Assembly election: 22 March 2026

Meeting place
- National Assembly Building, Ljubljana

Website
- www.dz-rs.si

The Slovenian Parliament (Slovene: Slovenski parlament) is the informal designation of the general representative body of the Slovenian nation and the legislative body of the Republic of Slovenia.

According to the Constitution of Slovenia, the general representative body of the Slovenian nation is the National Assembly. The general public in Slovenia often refer to the National Assembly alone as the Slovenian Parliament. However, the National Council, the representative body of basic social groups, also performs a further, if minor, part of the legislative function.

The opinions of experts and of the general Slovenian public on whether the Slovenian Parliament is bicameral or unicameral differ, although most consider it to be incompletely bicameral. In 2008, the Constitutional Court of Slovenia recognized the Slovenian Parliament as incompletely bicameral.

== History ==
The first legislature operating on the territory of modern Slovenia were the provincial Estates of the Duchy of Carniola, the most heavily Slovene (95% in 1910) subdivision of the Holy Roman Empire and later Austrian / Austro-Hungarian Empires.

Regular meetings of the Estates began in 1410. The four estates represented were clergy, feudal lords, knights, and magistrates of significant towns. The institution endured for almost four centuries, being dissolved with the establishment of the Napoleonic-era Illyrian Provinces.

In 1848, Carniola received a Landtag or Diet, one of the regional legislatures established throughout the Austrian empire in response to that year's revolutions. The body was however almost immediately suspended in the course of the Metternichian reaction, though it was reconstituted in 1861.

Shaped by the Dual Compromise, the Landtag's competencies extended solely to local matters. Its thirty-seven delegates (increased to fifty just before WWI) were sharply divided into "nationalist" Slovene and "constitutionalist" German factions, with the former generally predominating (despite a strong pro-German bias in the electoral law.) The Landtag was dissolved (along with the duchy) in the 1918 collapse of Austro-Hungary.

The subsequent Kingdom of Yugoslavia was a centralist regime, with no regional autonomies. The legal continuity of the present Slovenian Parliament can therefore be traced to the Plenum of the Liberation Front, a 120-delegate body selected by an electoral college of 650 local delegates in October of 1943. Renamed to the Slovene National Liberation Committee in 1944, the body's purpose was to provide a legal and political foundation to the anti-Nazi resistance. It met intermittently in liberated areas for the remainder of the German occupation, functioning as the local branch of the pan-Yugoslav AVNOJ and largely confirming its decrees. As communist Yugoslavia took form in the aftermath of the war, the Committee was replaced by the Constituent Assembly of the People's Republic of Slovenia, a unicameral body - also with 120 delegates - elected on 27 October 1946.

As the name suggests, the Assembly had been convened to draft the first Slovene constitution. Having done so, it began functioning as a legislature, and was renamed to the People's Assembly of the People's Republic of Slovenia on 17 January 1947. In 1953, the Assembly was made bicameral, encompassing two houses ("zbor", usually also translated as "assembly".) The generally-representative Assembly of the Republic was supplemented with an Assembly of Producers, intended for representatives of the state economic sector, a reflection of the government's ambition toward rapid industrialization.

In 1963, a new constitution renamed the polity the Socialist Republic of Slovenia. The legislative system was thoroughly revamped, making the new Assembly of the Socialist Republic of Slovenia a rare quintocameral legislature. It comprised an:

- Assembly of the Republic
- Economic Assembly
- Educational and Cultural Assembly
- Socio-Medical Assembly
- Organisational and Political Assembly

This arrangement was soon found to be unwieldy, and a 1968 amendment combined the middle three zbors into a single Assembly of Labor Associations, as well as renaming the final one to the Socio-Political Assembly. The three zbors were intended to represent different, nesting constituencies: the Assembly of the Republic was meant to be generally-representative, while the Assembly of Labor Associations was intended to represent the worker-managed state enterprises which were a hallmark of Yugoslav communism, and the Socio-Political Assembly was an internal organ of the Communist Party (though all three zbors were in practice wholly dominated by the Party.)

Along with the rest of Europe, Yugoslavia was wracked by a wave of reformist sentiment in the late 60s, followed by a Party reaction. This (and the advancing age of Tito) prompted relatively radical reforms in 1974, with a devolutionary new constitution that was echoed in the federal republics. The 1974 Slovene constitution abolished the Assembly of the Republic altogether, and transferred its competencies to the Socio-Political Assembly. Unlike the Assembly of the Republic - which had been de-facto dominated by the League of Communists of Slovenia (ZKS), but remained nominally a representative legislature elected by universal suffrage - the Socio-Political Assembly was expicitly a party body. Its fifty seats were formally allocated (ten each) to the ZKS and four of its subsidiary organizations:

- the League of Socialist Youth of Slovenia (ZSMS)
- the Socialist League of the Working People of Slovenia (SZDLS)
- the League of Trade Unions, and
- the Association of Veterans of the Slovenian National Liberation War

Delegates were elected indirectly, in Soviet-style single-candidate approval votes held by similar socio-political assemblies established at the municipal level.

Despite this fundamental change, the 1974 Constitution retained the tricameral structure established in 1968. The Socio-Political Assembly was supplemented with a Municipalities' Assembly (150 delegates) and an Assembly of United Labor (60-65 delegates). The latter was a continuation of the 1968 Assembly of Labor Associations, and was (like it) geared toward the representation of economic and occupational interests (though it also contained representatives from state agencies, and a single delegate from the federal armed forces.)

Legislative reforms in 1990 saw the word "Socialist" dropped from the republic's name and the ZKS surrendering its undemocratic privileges. In reforms preceding the multi-party elections of the same year, the three zbors were retained, though their number of deputies was equalized at 80 each, for a total of 240. The Socio-Political Assembly was converted into a general representative body, while the other two zbors retained their specialized function, though on a contested basis. The basic structure of the 1974 constitution therefore endured until the first elections under the 1991 constitution could be held in December of 1992.

The new constitution abolished all three zbors. The Socio-Political Assembly was replaced by the National Assembly, a democratically-elected general representative body with ninety delegates. The functions of the Municipalities' Assembly and Assembly of United Labor were informally combined in a new 40-seat National Council, with 18 seats allotted to local interests and the remaining 22 to basic social groups such as employers, students, and workers.

== Seat ==
The National Assembly and the National Council convene in a modernist palace known as the "Slovenian Parliament" and sited in Republic Square, Ljubljana. It was built between 1954 and 1959 by the architect Vinko Glanz. An unrealized project for a Slovenian Parliament building, designed by the architect Jože Plečnik in the late 1940s, features on the Slovenian euro coins.

== See also ==
- Politics of Slovenia
- List of legislatures by country
