= Slovenian Philharmonic Orchestra =

Orchestra in Ljubljana, Slovenia

Coordinates: 46°02′58″N 14°30′17″E

- Orchestra
- Native name: Simfonični orkester Slovenske filharmonije
- Founded: 1908
- Location: Ljubljana, Slovenia
- Concert hall: Marjan Kozina Hall, Philharmonic Hall, Congress Square; Gallus Hall, Cankar Centre, Republic Square
- Principal conductor: Kahi Solomnišvili
- Website: filharmonija.si

The Slovenian Philharmonic Orchestra (Slovene: Simfonični orkester Slovenske filharmonije) is a Slovenian orchestra based in Ljubljana. Its primary concert venues are the Marjan Kozina Hall in Philharmonic Hall, Congress Square (Kongresni trg), Ljubljana, and the Gallus Hall at the Cankar Centre at Republic Square (Trg republike) in Ljubljana.

== History ==
The history of the orchestra goes back to 1701 with the founding of the Academia Philharmonicorum, which performed oratorios and other works of the era. This organisation then became the Philharmonic Society (Filharmonična družba) in 1794. On 23 October 1908, the Filharmonična družba officially merged with the Glasbena matica (The Music Society) to form the first incarnation of the Slovenian Philharmonic Orchestra, which lasted from 1908 to 1913. In 1947, the re-establishment of a new incarnation of the orchestra was initiated. This new version of the orchestra gave its first concert on 13 January 1948, conducted by Salvador Bacarisse and attended by the composer Marjan Kozina, who became the first administrator of the orchestra.

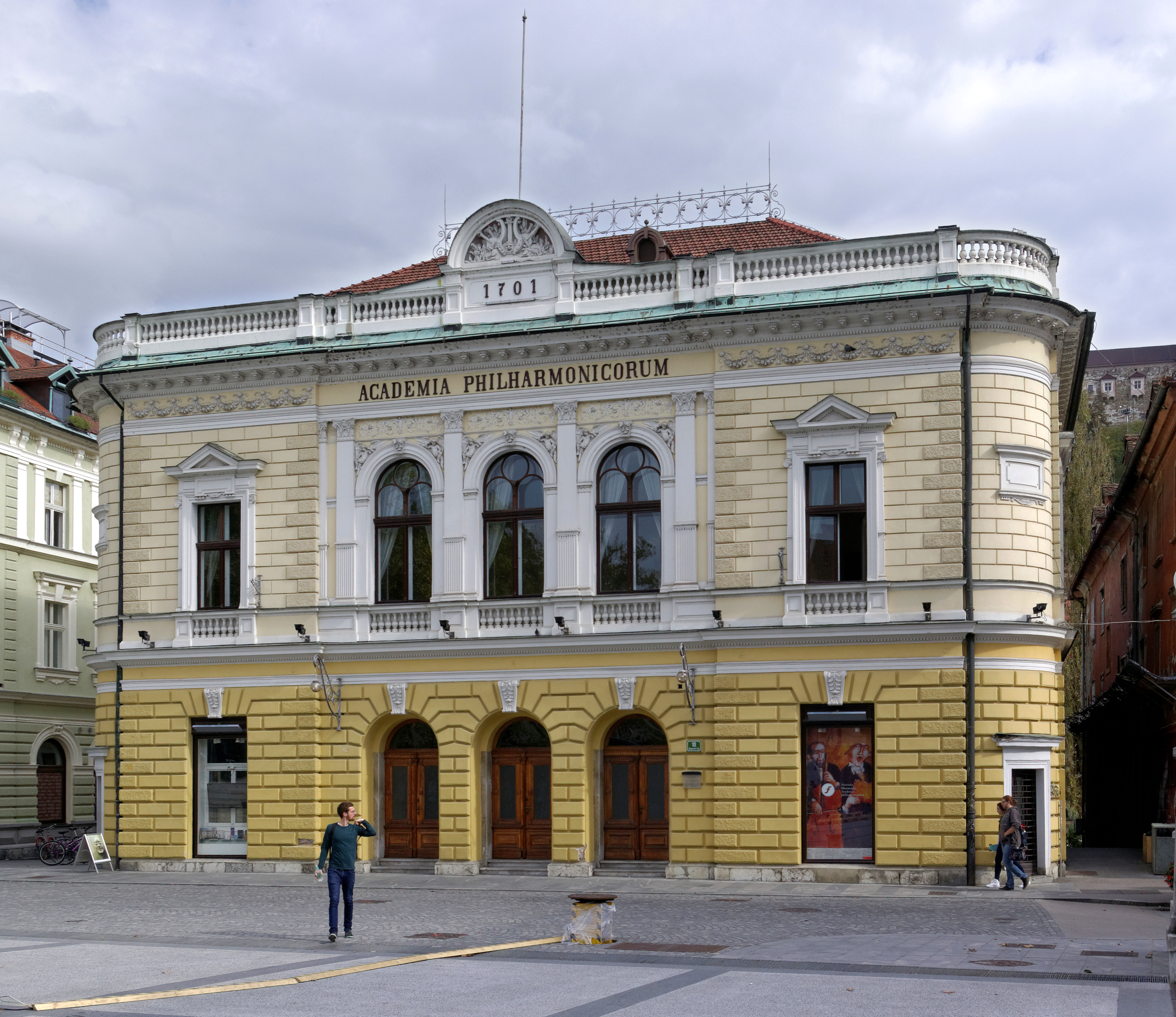
Philharmonic Hall, the main venue of the Slovenian Philharmonic Orchestra, at Congress Square in Ljubljana

The orchestra employed a number of "permanent conductors" (stalni dirigenti) from its 1948 re-inception, including Jakov Cipci (1948–1955), Samo Hubad (1948–1966), Bogo Leskovic (1951–1958), and Lovro von Matačić (1955–1956). Oskar Danon was the first conductor to have the title of principal conductor, from 1970 to 1974. The first non-Slovenian principal conductor was George Pehlivanian, from 2005 to 2008. From 2013 to 2015, the principal conductor was Canadian-born Keri-Lynn Wilson, the first female principal conductor in the orchestra's history. Uroš Lajovic succeeded Wilson as principal conductor from 2015 to 2017. With the 2024–2025 season, Kahi Solomnišvili became the orchestra's principal conductor.

== Principal conductors ==
- Oskar Danon (1970–1974)
- Uroš Lajovic (1974–1975; acting principal conductor)
- Marko Letonja (1996–2002)
- George Pehlivanian (2005–2008)
- Emmanuel Villaume (2008–2013)
- Keri-Lynn Wilson (2013–2015)
- Uroš Lajovic (2015–2017)
- Kakhi Solomnishvili (2024–present)
