= National Assembly Building of Slovenia =

Modernist palace in Slovenia

Coordinates: 46°03′06″N 14°30′04″E

National Assembly Building
- stavba Državnega zbora
- National Assembly Building, Ljubljana

- Location within Slovenia
- Former names: Palace of the People's Assembly (palača Ljudske skupščine)
- Alternative names: Parliament (Parlament)

General information
- Location: Republic Square, Ljubljana, Slovenia
- Construction started: 1954
- Completed: 1959; 67 years ago
- Owner: Slovenian Parliament

Technical details
- Floor area: 2,200 m^{2} (24,000 sq ft)

Design and construction
- Architect: Vinko Glanz
- Structural engineer: Alojzij Čigon
- Main contractor: Tehnika

Website
- www.dz-rs.si

The National Assembly Building (Slovene: stavba Državnega zbora), officially the Assembly of the Republic of Slovenia (Skupščina Republike Slovenije), also colloquially the Parliament (Parlament) in Ljubljana, the capital of Slovenia, is a modernist palace housing the legislature of Slovenia. Built between 1954 and 1959 upon plans by the architect Vinko Glanz, it is a three-story building with an area of 2,200 m^{2} (24,000 sq ft). It is located at Republic Square in the center of Ljubljana. Annual visitor numbers are around 13,000.

Despite its name, the building houses both the National Assembly (lower house) and the National Council (upper house) of the legislature. The building is listed in the official records as a cultural monument of local significance. It was opened on 19 February 1959 as the Palace of the People's Assembly (Palača Ljudske skupščine), as it was originally the seat of the Socialist Republic of Slovenia's legislature, the People's Assembly.

== Construction ==
A view of the building from across Republic Square

Following the end of World War II, a venue was needed to house the legislature of Slovenia, at the time a federal republic of communist Yugoslavia. Due to the centralizing policies of the pre-1941 Kingdom of Yugoslavia, there had been no sub-national legislatures in the interbellum period; the Austro-Hungarian palace on Congress Square that had housed the pre-1918 Provincial Diet of the Duchy of Carniola did still exist, but had been repurposed as the rectorate of the University of Ljubljana, and additionally had an undesirable association with foreign rule.

In the late 1940s, the Slovenian government began soliciting proposals for a new legislature building. Two designs were submitted by Slovenia's most respected architect, Jože Plečnik; the second of these, known as the "Cathedral of Freedom," featured a tall cone-shaped dome rising to 394 ft (120 m) atop a double colonnade. The authorities rejected Plečnik's designs as too ostentatious, and instead commissioned the architect Vinko Glanz, who had proposed a much more conservative and modest design than either of the Plečnik concepts: an austere modernist palace in the International Style, with no monumental elements or decorations save a large sculptural group of bronze figures framing its main portico.

Work began in 1954 on construction of the building to Glanz's plans, executed by the Ljubljana construction firm Tehnika. Part of Glanz's ethos for the building was that the materials used should be of Slovenian provenance, including local hardwoods, granite, and marble. Twenty-seven master craftsmen worked on the metalwork and joinery.

=== Opening ===
The building, then known as the Palace of the People's Assembly, hosted the first session of the People's Assembly of the People's Republic of Slovenia on 19 February 1959.

For its first 32 years, the building held meetings of the tricameral Assembly of the Socialist Republic of Slovenia. Following the independence of Slovenia in 1991, it gave way to use by the Slovenian Parliament: both the National Assembly and the National Council.

== Design ==
=== Exterior architecture ===
The main entrance with Kalin and Putrih's sculptures surrounding

The four-storey building is externally austere. A freestanding cube, the main façade faces Republic Square and is inlaid with Karst marble, with green Oplotnica granite below each window. The only decorative element is the two storey main portal – four oak doors surrounded by statues by Zdenko Kalin and Karel Putrih which represent working people.

=== Interior ===
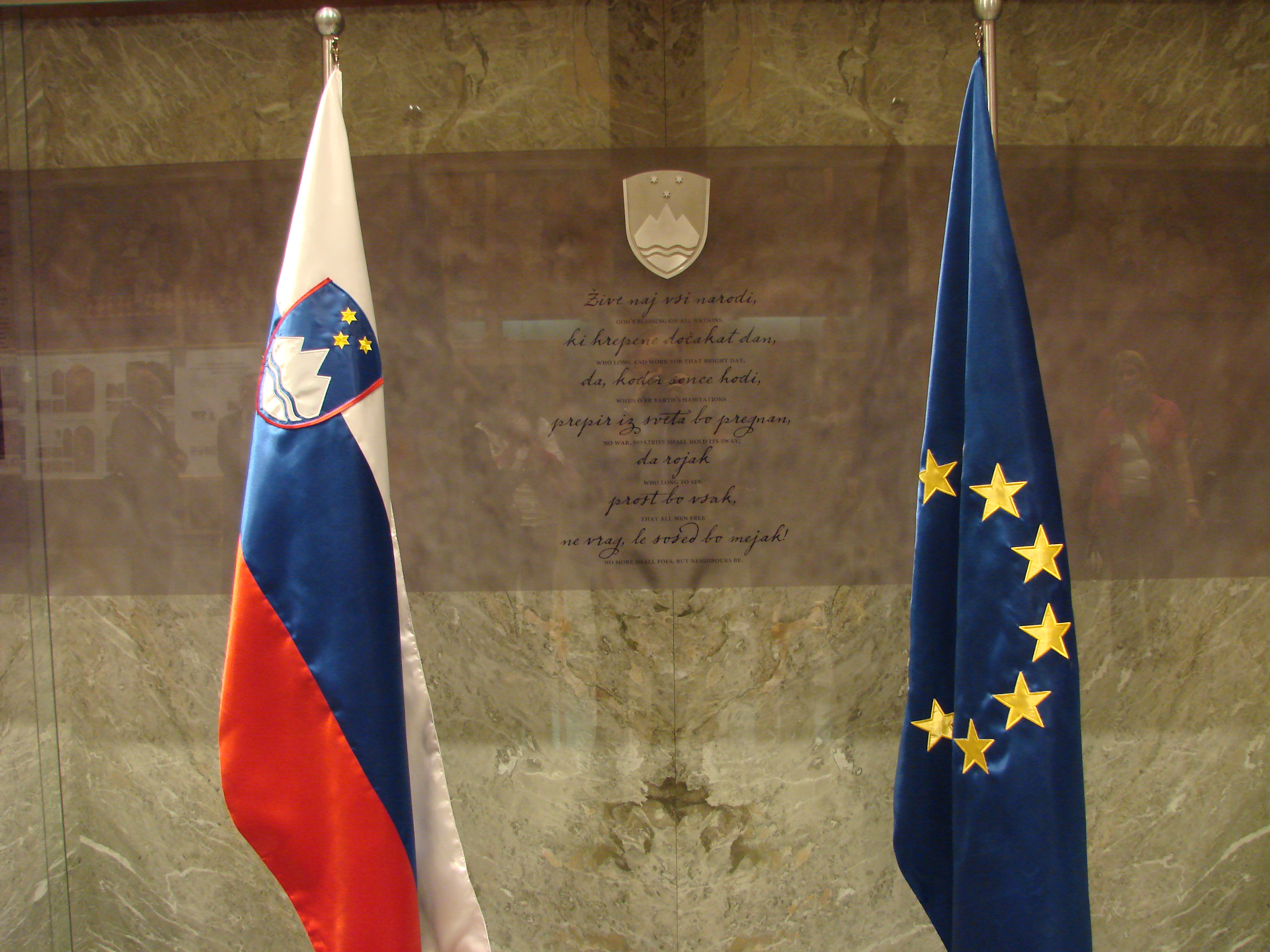
Slovenian national anthem in the lobby of the National Assembly Building

Inside, the building is furnished with paintings and frescoes by a selection of Slovenian artists. The largest, a 67.4 by 1.4 metres (221.1 by 4.6 ft) wall painting by the 20th century mural artist Slavko Pengov, extends across the length of the entrance hall and illustrates the history of Slovenians. Created in 1958 and 1959, the mural portrays events including the Revolutions of 1848, the First World War and the 1918 creation of the Kingdom of Serbs, Croats and Slovenes, the Second World War and national liberation, and the creation of socialist Yugoslavia and homeland reconstruction. The walls of the first-floor corridor are furnished with portraits of former Presidents of the National Assembly. Following the 1991 independence of Slovenia, the building's interior has been refurbished several times to suit the desideratum of the new Slovenian Parliament.

The center of the building is occupied by the 422 m^{2} (4,540 sq ft), 150 seat Great Hall, where the National Assembly convenes. Formerly rectangular, it was renovated into an amphitheater in 2000. Each seat has a microphone, an automatic voting system, plug socket and access to the National Assembly's computer network. The chair facing the doors to the hall is for the President of the National Assembly. Behind it, a bronze relief of the coat of arms of Slovenia is positioned on the marble wall. The sculptor Marko Pogačnik created the work in 1991 to celebrate independence. There is also a 106-seat gallery for the public and guests to view the Great Hall.

The National Council holds its meetings in the Small Hall, on the ground floor. The room is also used for public presentations and conferences.

== Incidents ==
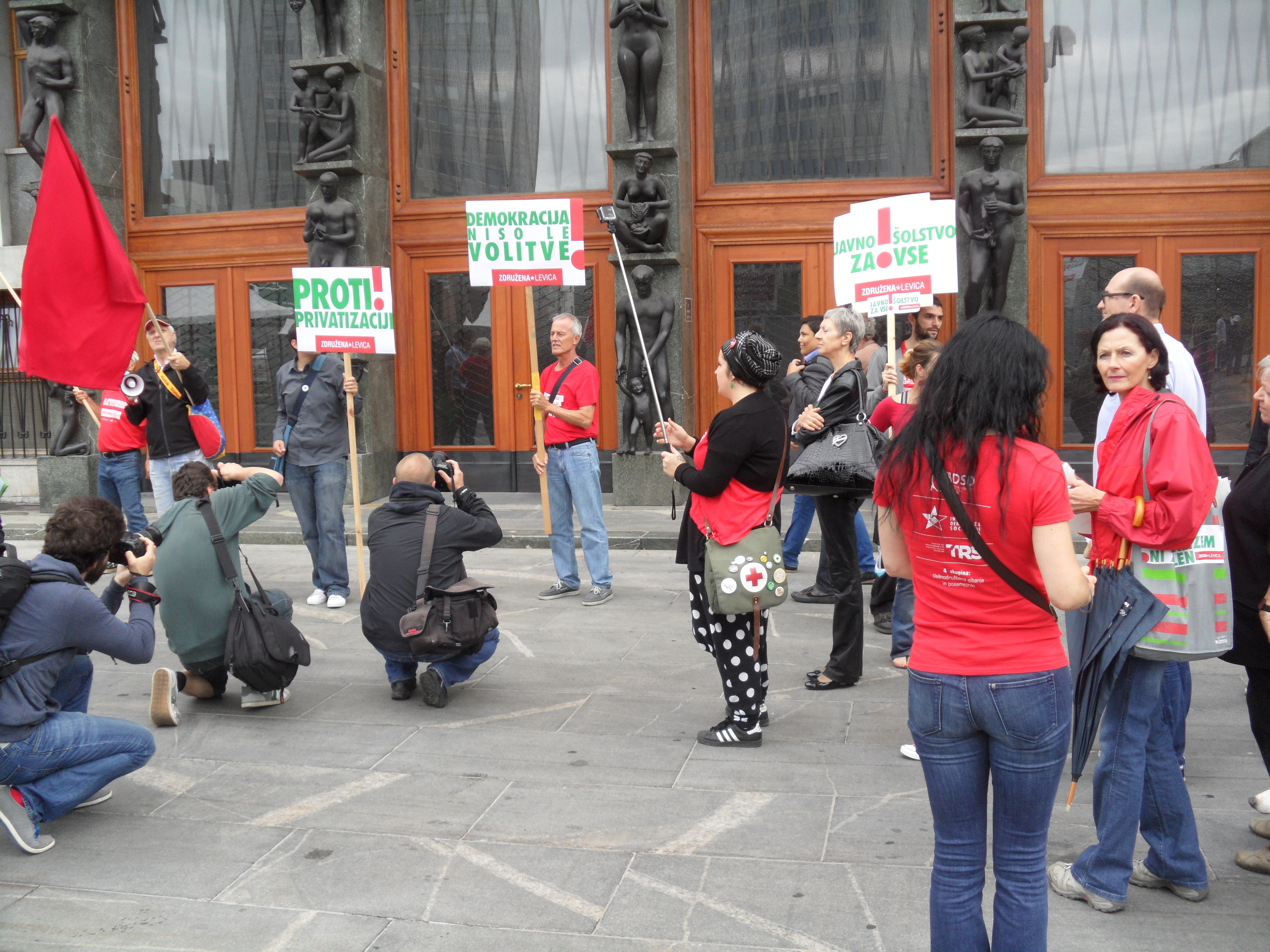
Demonstrators outside the main portal in 2014

On 18 May 2010, the front façade of the building, made of rare green tonalite, was severely damaged by students who threw granite rocks removed from a nearby pavement at the building's main entrance. The incident happened during a large student protest against the proposed law on the introduction of mini jobs that would curb student work and changes to scholarship policy. Repairs to the building were estimated at 27,000 euros.
