= Plečnik Parliament =

Plečnik Parliament (Slovene: Plečnikov parlament) is the colloquial name of two designs for a building intended to house the legislature of the People's Republic of Slovenia within the Federal People's Republic of Yugoslavia.

Formally known as the Slovene Acropolis and the Cathedral of Freedom (Slovenska akropola / Katedrala svobode), the two designs were proposed by Slovenia's most eminent architect, Jože Plečnik, but were rejected by postwar authorities in favour of a more conventional design.

== Slovene Acropolis ==
In response to a personal government invitation during the late 1940s, Plečnik first proposed the fairly radical idea of placing the parliament on the hilltop above the Slovenian capital of Ljubljana, then (as now) occupied by the Ljubljana Castle. Influenced by his own extensive remodeling of Prague Castle during the 1920s, the "Slovene Acropolis" concept called for the demolition of much of the medieval structure and its replacement with a monumental octagonal complex, which would have been accessible from the city below by a triumphal arcaded stairway beginning on Town Square, next to the town hall.

The authorities were caught off-guard by the radicalism of the plan and called for a second round of proposals, this time in the form of an open competition, and with a location for the building specified: the Ilirija swimming pool complex in Ljubljana's Tivoli gardens. While not in the habit of entering competitions due to his age and status, Plečnik's initial reluctance eventually subsided. His second design, the "Cathedral of Freedom," is now far better known than the first and the far more common referent of the term "Plečnik Parliament," although the first proposal is technically encompassed by it as well.

== Cathedral of Freedom ==
A square, colonnaded false façade would have surrounded the cylindrical main building of two stories, surmounted by a tall, spirally tapering conical cupola. Supported internally by inclined columns, the cupola would have spanned the parliament chamber. The facade would have measured 50 m in length, the tower rising to 120 m. Several slightly varying designs were produced, some including a second colonnade wrapping the second floor of the main building, different porticoes, or an asymmetrical ground floor.

== Fate ==
Nominally, the reason the project remained unrealized was the financial burden it would have imposed on the struggling post-World War II recovery economy; in practice, numerous other obstacles were even less surmountable:

- The structure was widely perceived as being too grandiose for a legislature of what was at the time a federal constituent of Yugoslavia, and therefore a potentially-dangerous focal point for nationalism.
- While Plečnik continued to hold a position of honour as the nation's preeminent architect, his devout Catholicism was viewed with suspicion by postwar authorities, and his idiosyncratic architectural style had fallen out of fashion with the public.
- The first design had been deemed additionally unacceptable for entailing the destruction of a historic landmark.

In 1954, work finally began on a permanent legislature building, to be located on Republic Square in the center of Ljubljana. Planned by the architect Vinko Glanz, this was a much more conservative and modest design than either of the two Plečnik concepts, being an austere modernist palace with no monumental elements or decorations save a large sculptural group of bronze figures framing its main portico. Nevertheless, the building's general plan is thought to contain faint echoes of Plečnik's "Cathedral" design. It was completed in 1959, two years after the architect's death.

== Cultural significance ==
Plečnik's second design (the Cathedral of Freedom) retains resonance with many Slovenes, who view it as a minor national symbol:

- Slovenska akropola is the title of a 1987 album by Slovenian industrial music group Laibach.
- The first stamp issued by Slovenia on June 26, 1991, one day after its declaration of independence, depicted the Plečnik Parliament in silver on a blue-green background. Carrying a denomination of 5 units of the then as-yet-unnamed national currency, it was immediately banned by Yugoslav postal authorities. The stamp had been issued illegally, as Slovenia was not yet a member of the Universal Postal Union.
- Slovenian band Laibach included 3D animation of Cathedral of Freedom in the music video of song cover version "In the Army Now" from their 1994 album NATO.
- On 7 October 2005, the Plečnik Parliament was unveiled as the design for the national side of Slovene 0.10 € Euro coins.
- On 24 April 2007, the Slovenian World Congress called for the construction of the Parliament, predicting that its "conical tower would serve as the unifying axis, the omphalos, the axis mundi of world Slovenedom."
- During August 2008, a maquette of the Parliament was featured at the Project Plečnik exhibition on the architect's life, held at the Council of the European Union building in Brussels, Belgium on the occasion of the Slovene EU Presidency. The exhibition's curator Boris Podrecca described the Parliament as "the most charismatic object" of Plečnik's opus.

== See also ==
- Palace of Soviets
- Große Halle
