= Cankar Centre =

Convention center in Ljubljana, Slovenia

Coordinates: 46.05000°N 14.49891°E

- Cankarjev dom (in Slovene)
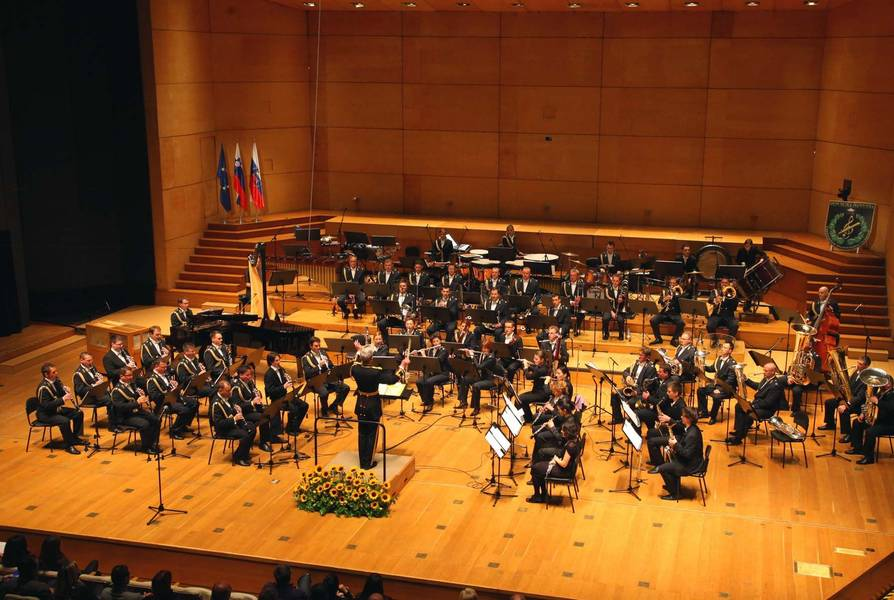
- 2012 concert of the Slovenian Armed Forces Orchestra in Gallus Hall
- Interactive map of the Cankar Centre area

General information
- Location: Republic Square, Ljubljana, Slovenia
- Construction started: 1977
- Completed: 1982

Design and construction
- Architect: Edvard Ravnikar

The Cankar Centre or Cankar Hall (Slovene: Cankarjev dom) is the largest Slovenian convention, congress and culture center. The building was designed by the architect Edvard Ravnikar and was built at the southern edge of Republic Square in Ljubljana between 1977 and 1982. Construction was funded entirely by the Socialist Republic of Slovenia.

== Origin of the name ==
The center is named after the Slovene writer and social-democratic politician Ivan Cankar (1876–1918).

== Interior ==
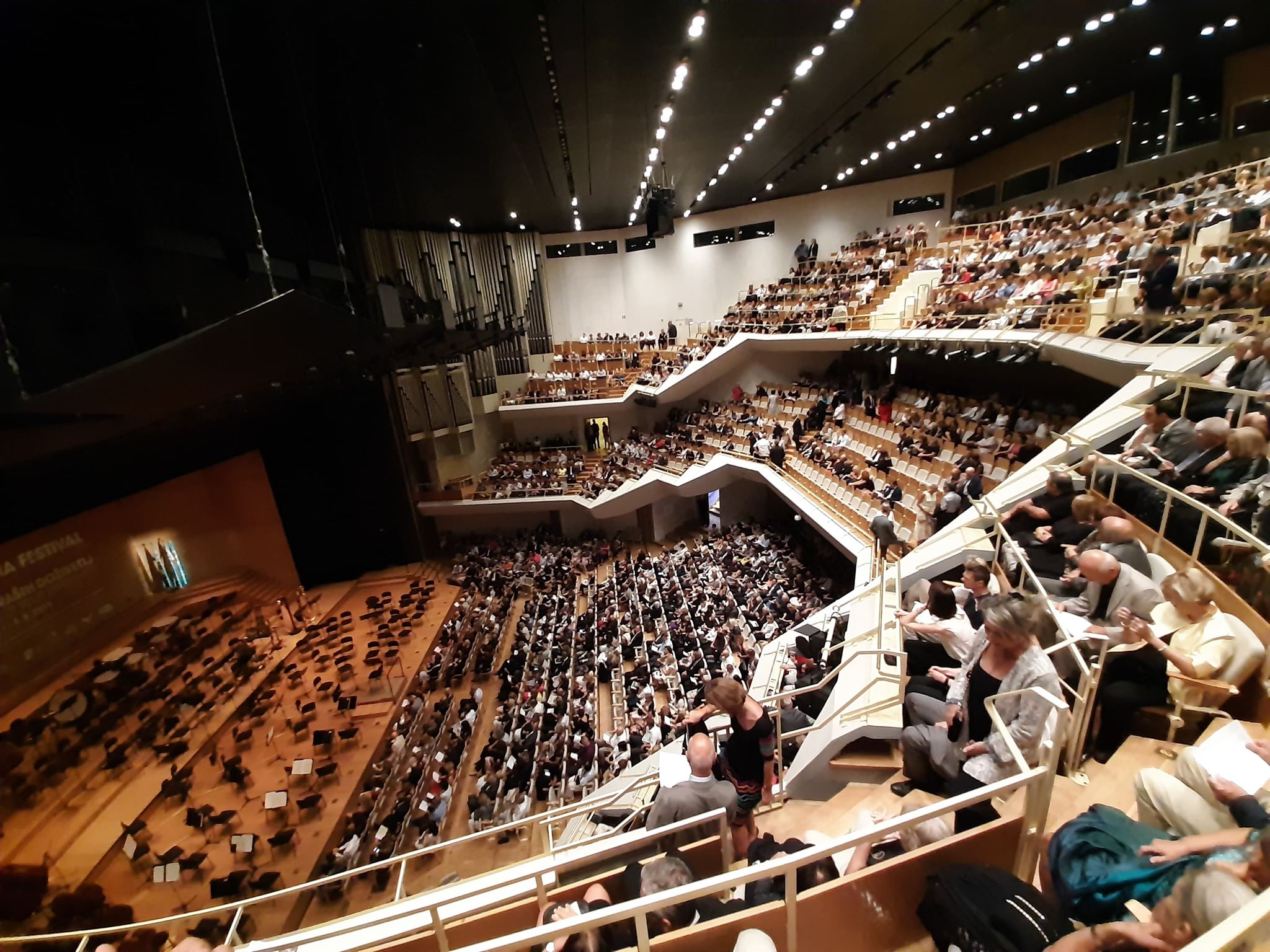
Interior of Gallus Hall

The centre has four halls named after Slovene artists: Gallus Hall (named after the late-Renaissance composer Jacobus Gallus), Linhart Hall (named after the Enlightenment erudite and playwright Anton Tomaž Linhart), Kosovel Hall (named after the Expressionist poet Srečko Kosovel), and Štih Hall (named after the literary critic Bojan Štih). The Cankar Centre also has a large foyer where events are held (artistic performances, dances, book fairs, etc.). In front of the building stands a monument to Ivan Cankar, designed in 1982 by the sculptor Slavko Tihec.

In September 2011 the renovation of the first lobby was held, increasing the height of the ceiling, replacing the carpet with bamboo parquet and refurbished lighting; The recast was received by critics of the Association of Architects of Ljubljana, the Association of Architects of Slovenia, the Chamber of Architecture and Space of Slovenia, the Architecture and Design Museum, the Dessa Galleries and the Ferry Institute for the purpose of encroaching on the architectural image Space.

== History ==
The ground floor of the centre, like most of the present-day square, was owned by the Roman Catholic Church until 1960, when it was nationalized by the People's Republic of Slovenia. During the building of the Cankar Centre, remnants of the ancient Roman town of Emona were found; the Roman wall was dynamited to make way for construction. Most of the finds have been transferred to the National Museum of Slovenia, which stands on the opposite side of the square.

== See also ==
- Culture of Slovenia
