= Jože Plečnik =

Slovenian architect (1872-1957)

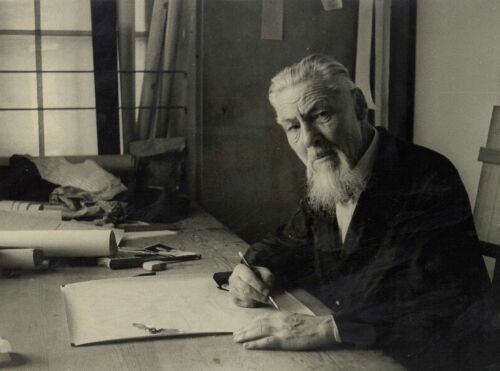
- Plečnik at a drawing desk, 1943
- Born: 23 January 1872; Laibach, Duchy of Carniola, Austria-Hungary
- Died: 7 January 1957 (aged 84); Ljubljana, Yugoslavia
- Occupation: Architect
- Buildings: Triple Bridge, Ljubljana, (1929–32); National and University Library (1930–41); Prague Castle (1920–34)
- Projects: unrealized Slovenian Acropolis (Cathedral of Freedom) (1947)

Jože Plečnik (23 January 1872 – 7 January 1957) was a Slovenian architect who had a major impact on the modern architecture of Vienna, Prague and of Ljubljana, the capital of Slovenia, most notably by designing the iconic Triple Bridge and the Slovenian National and University Library building, as well as the embankments along the Ljubljanica River, the Ljubljana Central Market buildings, the Ljubljana cemetery, parks, plazas. His architectural imprint on Ljubljana has been compared to the impact Antoni Gaudí had on Barcelona.

His style is associated with the Vienna Secession style of architecture (a type of Art Nouveau), but he also has influences from the baroque tradition in Slovenia, as well as Byzantine and early eighteenth century Viennese architecture. Plečnik was one of the notable twentieth century masters who embraced historic forms and ideas, paying what he believed to be a debt to history. He remained a classicist of the Schinkel School, rejecting the more radical ideas of other European architects such as Walter Gropius. Besides in Ljubljana, he worked in Vienna, Belgrade and on Prague Castle. He influenced the avant-garde Czech Cubism. He is also a founding member of the Ljubljana School of Architecture, joining it upon an invitation by Ivan Vurnik, another notable Ljubljana architect.

== Life ==
Plečnik was born in Laibach, present-day Ljubljana, Slovenia, to Andreas Plečnik, a carpenter from Hotedršica, and to Helena (née Molka) from Ljubljana, and he was baptized Josef Plečnik. Plečnik followed in his father's footsteps, training in woodworking during primary school. This knowledge proved useful in Vienna where he worked for two years as a designer and supervisor making furniture at a woodworking company. As a teenager he was sent to a vocational school, but as a talented draftsman, he then was sent to a technical school in Graz, where he found his first mentor, Léopold Theyer. He studied under noted Viennese architect and educator Otto Wagner and worked in Wagner's architecture office until 1900. A woman-friend asked Plečnik to marry her written in a letter. He replied, "I am already married to my architecture."

== Early work ==
From 1900 through 1910, while practicing in the Wagner's office in Vienna, he designed the Langer House (1900) and the Zacherlhaus (1903–1905). The Zacherlhaus was notable for its use of reinforced concrete columns in the ground floor and mezzanine. This practice was considered risky at the time as the practice was fairly new. His use of reinforced concrete columns continued in his later project, The Church of the Holy Spirit.

His 1910–1913 Church of the Holy Spirit (Heilig-Geist-Kirche) is remarkable for its innovative use of poured-in-place concrete as both structure and exterior surface, and also for its abstracted classical form language. Most radical is the church's crypt, with its slender concrete columns and angular, cubist capitals and bases.

In 1911, Plečnik moved to Prague, where he taught at the college of arts and crafts. The first president of the new Czechoslovak Republic from 1918 onwards, Tomáš Masaryk, appointed Plečnik chief architect for the 1920 renovation of Prague Castle. From 1920 until 1934 Plečnik completed a wide range of projects at the castle, including renovation of gardens and courtyards, the design and installation of monuments and sculptures, and the design of numerous new interior spaces, including the Plečnik Hall completed in 1930, which features three levels of abstracted Doric colonnades. His final work in Prague was the Church of the Most Sacred Heart of Our Lord (Roman Catholic, 1929–32).

Upon the 1921 establishment of the Ljubljana School of Architecture in his hometown of Ljubljana, he was invited by the fellow Slovenian architect Ivan Vurnik to become a founding faculty member and moved to teach architecture at the University of Ljubljana. Plečnik remained in Ljubljana until his death, and it is there that his influence as an architect is most noticeable.

== Ljubljana ==
Plečnik gave the capital of Slovenia, the city of Ljubljana, its modern identity by designing iconic buildings such as the Slovenian National and University Library building. Plečnik was also a transformative figure in the city planning of Ljubljana. This included restorations and improvements to historic buildings and sites. His work in city planning differed from many other efforts of the time, as his focus was further from practical problems found in the city, but instead focused on the overall experience of Ljubljana. He also designed other notable buildings, including the Vzajemna Insurance Company Offices, and contributed to many civic improvements. He renovated the city's bridges and the Ljubljanica River banks, and designed the Ljubljana Central Market buildings, the Ljubljana cemetery, parks, plazas etc. Buildings designed by Plečnik were built by the constructor Matko Curk.

After the World War II Plečnik's teaching role at the university was gradually reduced because he was over 70 years old. In 1947, he was invited by Ferdo Kozak, the president of the Slovenian People's Assembly to design the new Parliament building. He proposed the Cathedral of Freedom (also known as the Plečnik Parliament), a cylindrical two-story main building, topped by a tall conical dome and surrounded by a massive square colonnade. Probably the most daring of Plečnik's projects, at 120 meters high he proposed that it be built on top of Castle Hill, replacing the existing Ljubljana Castle. Slovenian Parliament leaders proposed a different location, and assigned Plečnik and four other architects to the project, but he begged off. In 1952, Ljubljana city leaders asked Plečnik to remodel the Križanke monastery into a venue for the Ljubljana Festival, his last big Ljubljana project. Other projects he completed at that time included the renovation of the Prešeren Theater, plus the Plečnik Arcades, stairway and fountain, all in Kranj, the reconstruction of churches, the design of the Pavilion on Brionian Islands (Tito's summer state residence), and numerous National Liberation War monuments (in Ljubljana-Trnovo, Vipava, Radeče, Črna na Koroškem, Dolenja vas, Sevnica, Laško, Split, Kraljevo). For his work, he twice received the Prešeren Award, in 1949 and 1952 for his life's work. Plečnik died in 1957 and received an official state funeral in Žale, attended by many political, cultural and church leaders.

== Other interests ==
After returning to Ljubljana 1921, Fran Saleški Finžgar, editor of the Hermagoras Society and Plečnik’s neighbor, encouraged him to work on book design. Plečnik did not want to be credited for this work.

== Legacy ==
In the 1980s, with postmodernist attention to Plečnik's work, the general interest in him has also been revived, after being sidestepped during the 1960s and 1970s. Since then, Plečnik's legacy has been commemorated in various ways, most notably in the 1990s on the Slovenian 500 tolar banknote, with the National and University Library of Slovenia depicted on the reverse.

The Cathedral of Freedom project by Plečnik is featured on the Slovenian 10 cent euro coin. Slovenska akropola is the title of a 1987 album by the Slovenian industrial music group Laibach. During August 2008, a maquette of the Parliament was featured at the Project Plečnik exhibition on the architect's life, held at the Council of the European Union building in Brussels, Belgium on the occasion of the Slovenian EU Presidency. The exhibition's curator Boris Podrecca described the Parliament as "the most charismatic object" of Plečnik's opus.

In addition, on 23 January 2012, to celebrate the 140th anniversary of Plečnik's birth, a picture of the Triple Bridge was featured as the official Google logo (Doodle) adaptation in Slovenia.

Plečnik's home in Ljubljana houses a museum of his life and work. There are several busts and sculptures of him situated around Ljubljana as reminders of his works and legacy.

In 2021, selected works of Plečnik in Ljubljana and Črna Vas were inscribed on the list of World Heritage Sites under the name "The works of Jože Plečnik in Ljubljana – Human Centred Urban Design".

As of 2024, the bibliography of works by Jože Plečnik and about him in COBISS, the Slovenian Co-operative Online Bibliographic System included 235 entries.

== Gallery ==
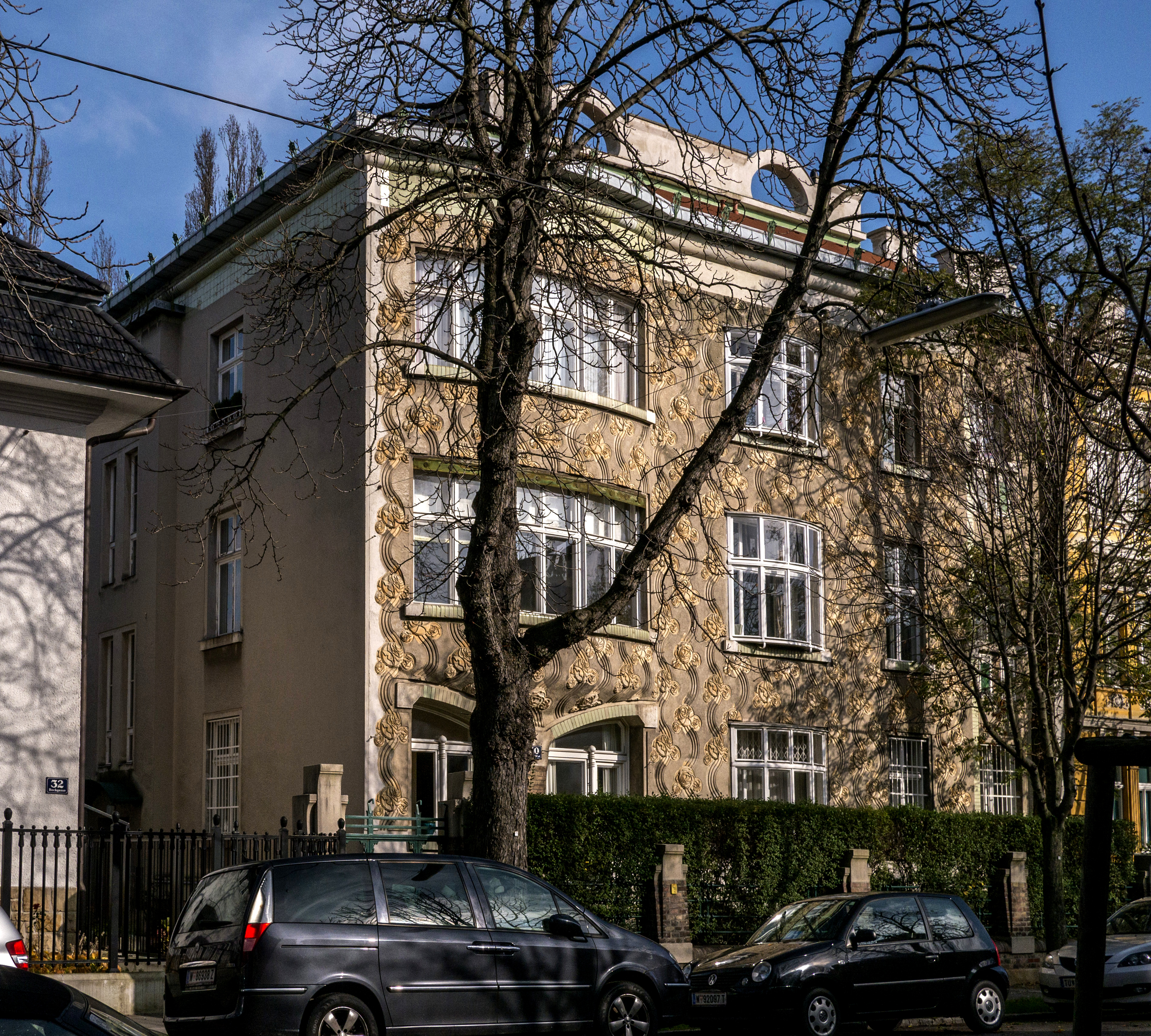
Villa Langer (1901)

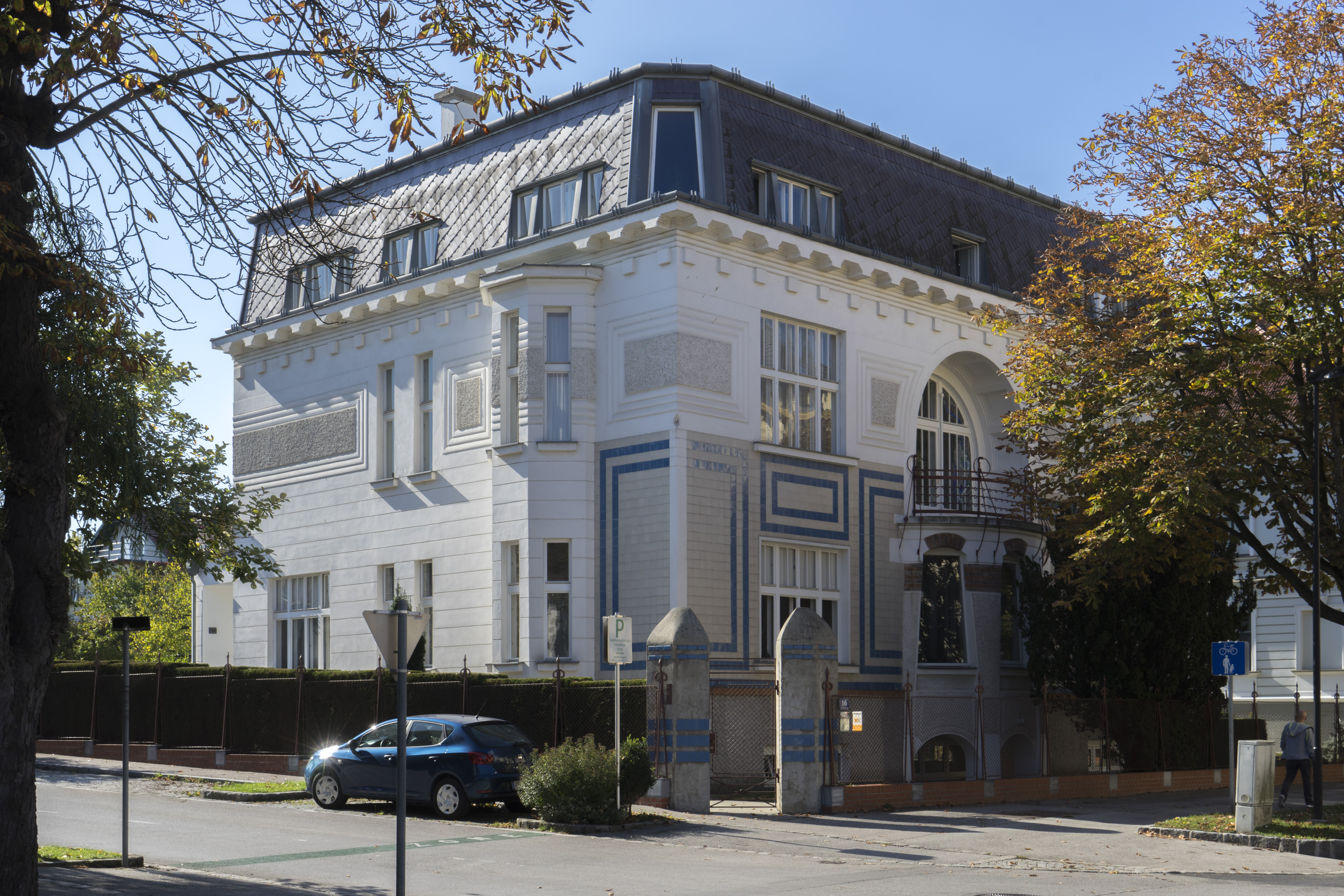
Villa Loos (1901)

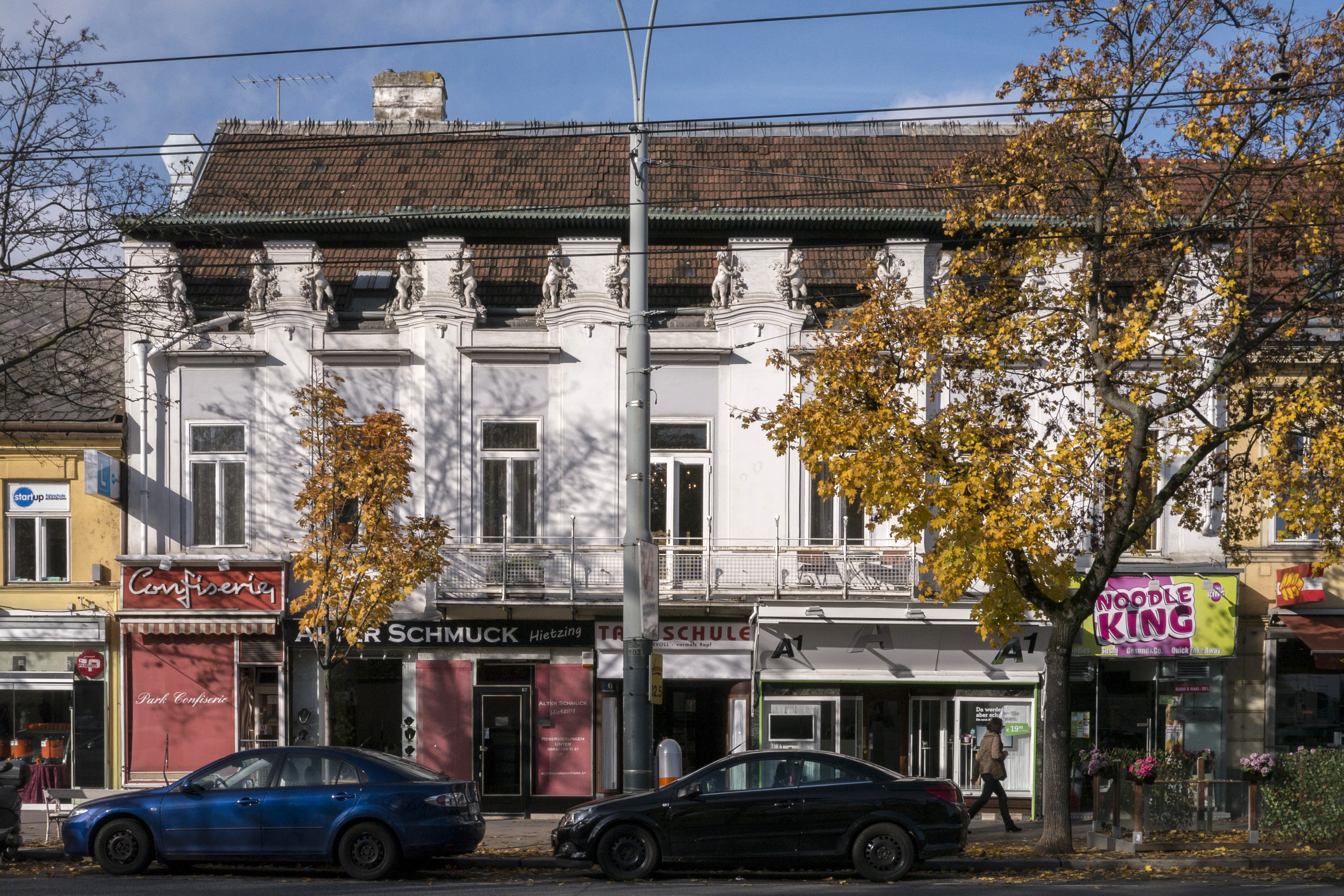
Villa Weidmann (1902)

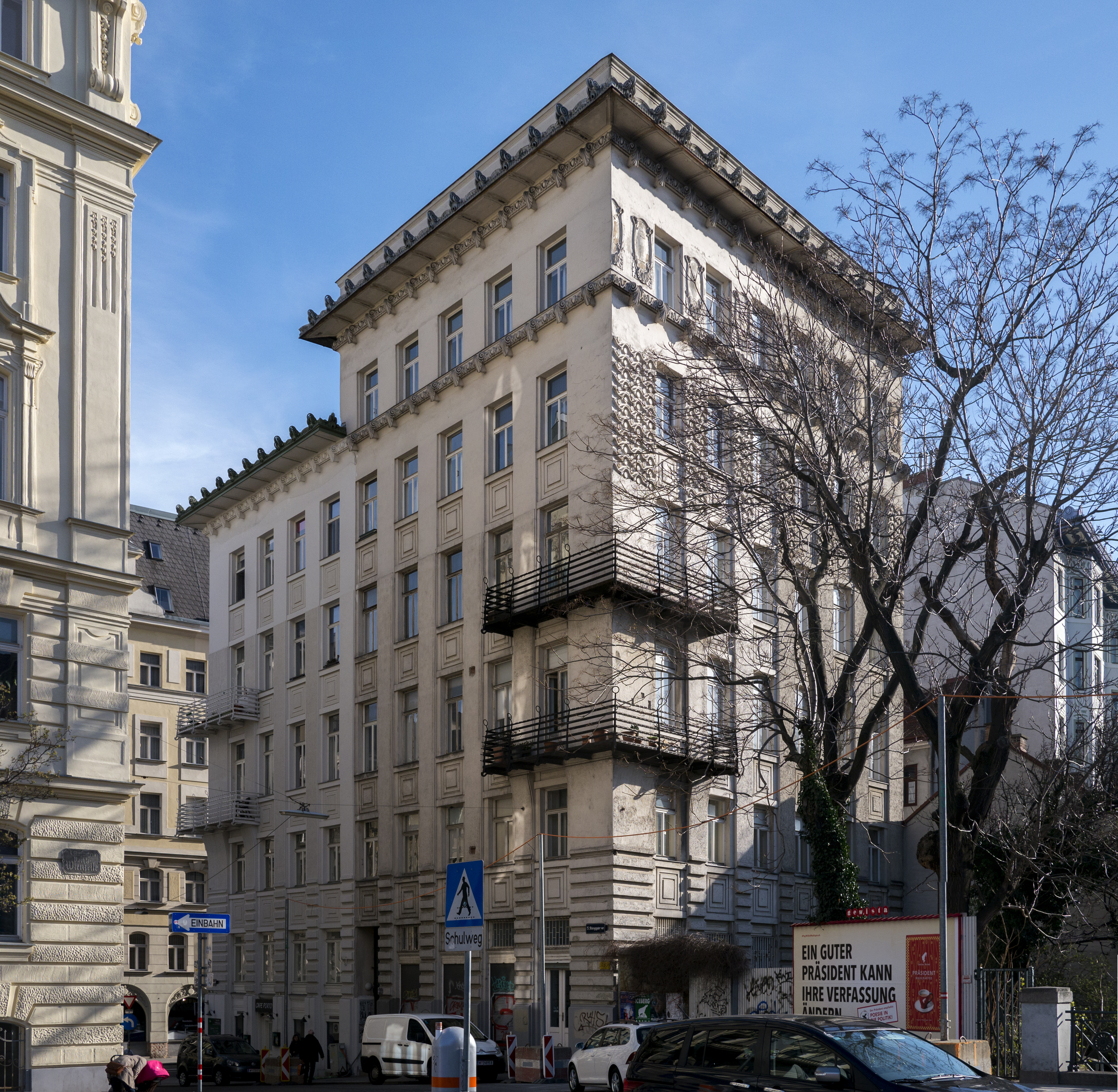
House Langer (1902)

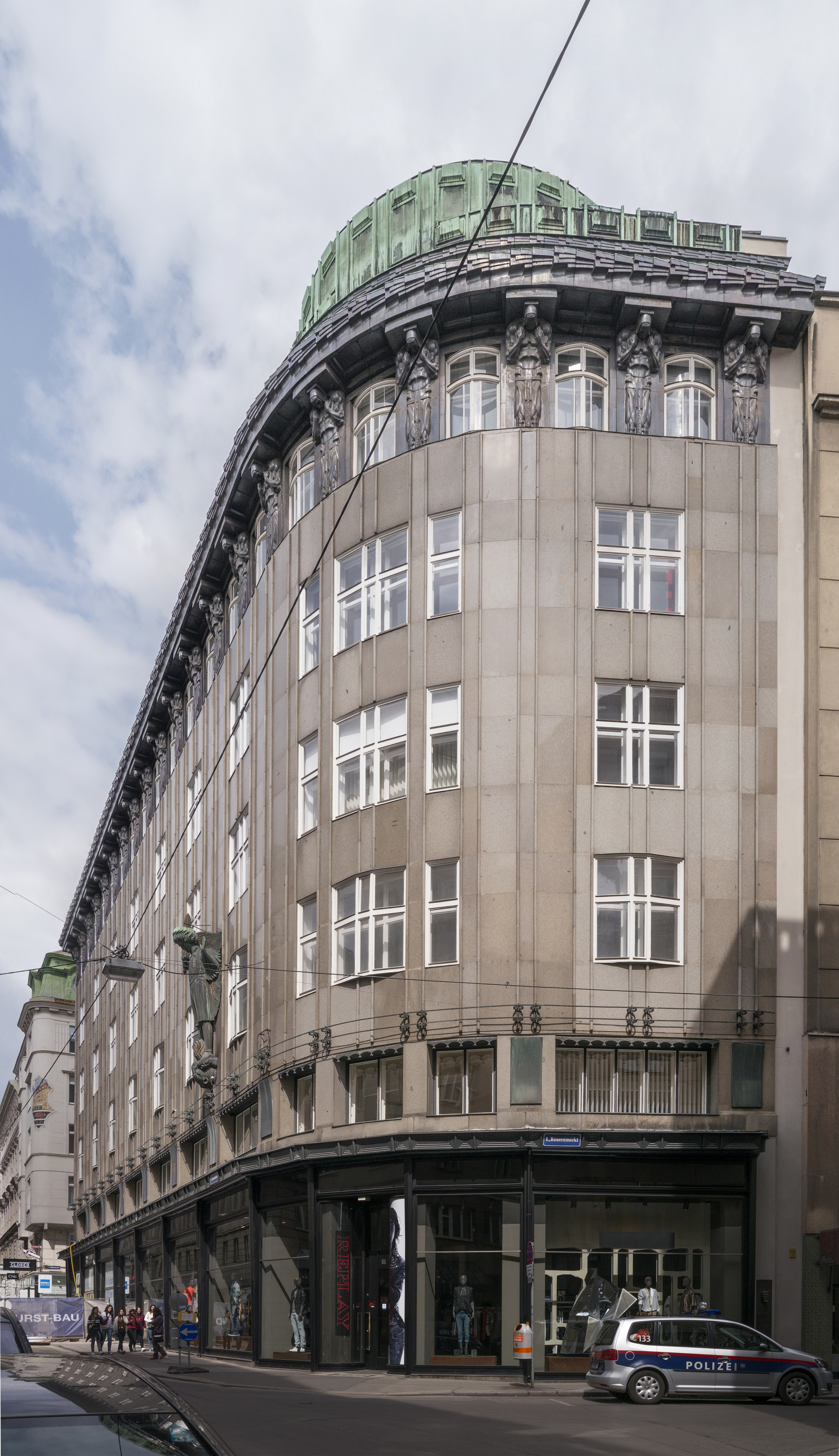
Zacherlhaus (1905)

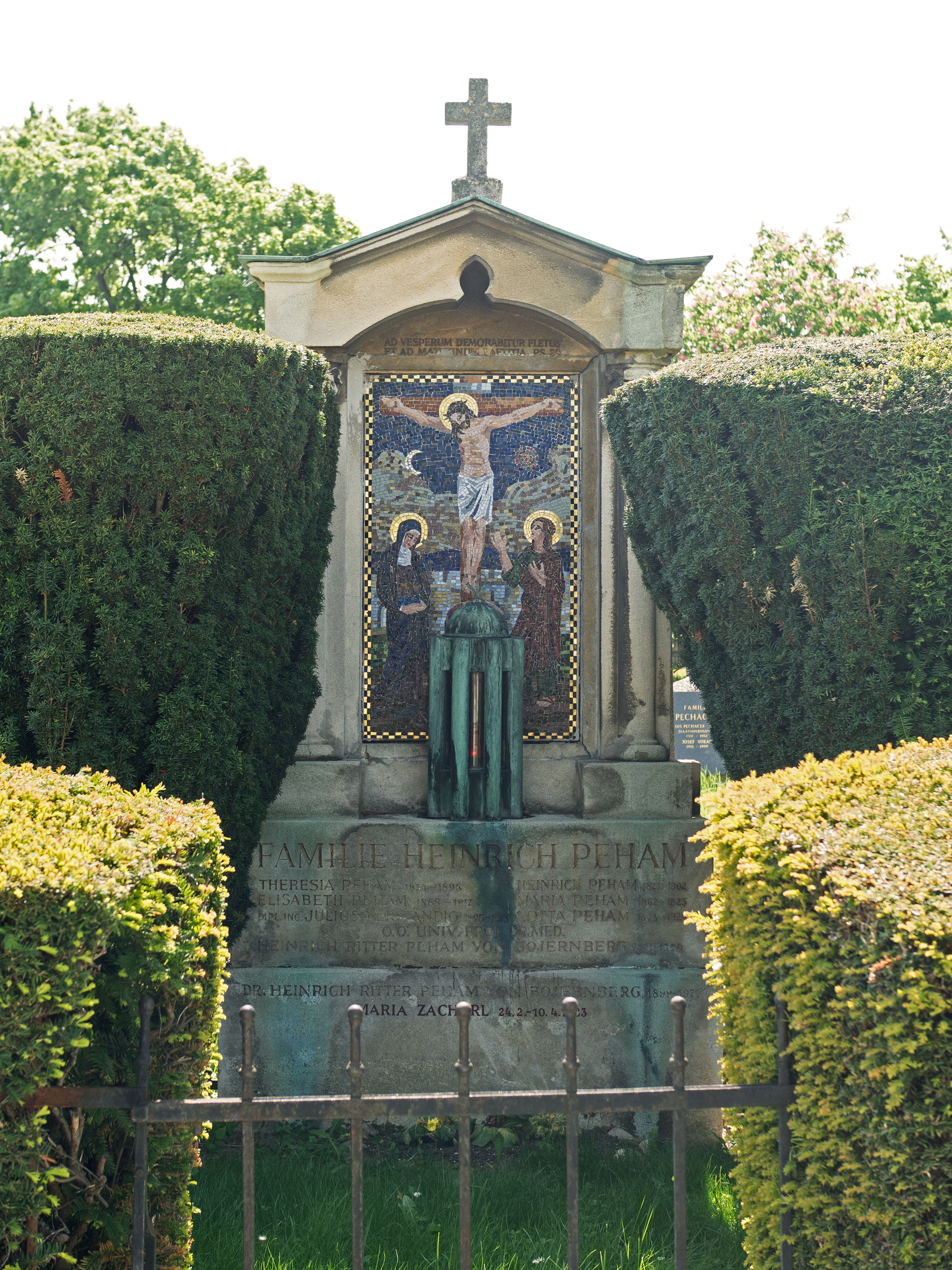
Tomb for Heinrich Peham von Bojernberg (1906)

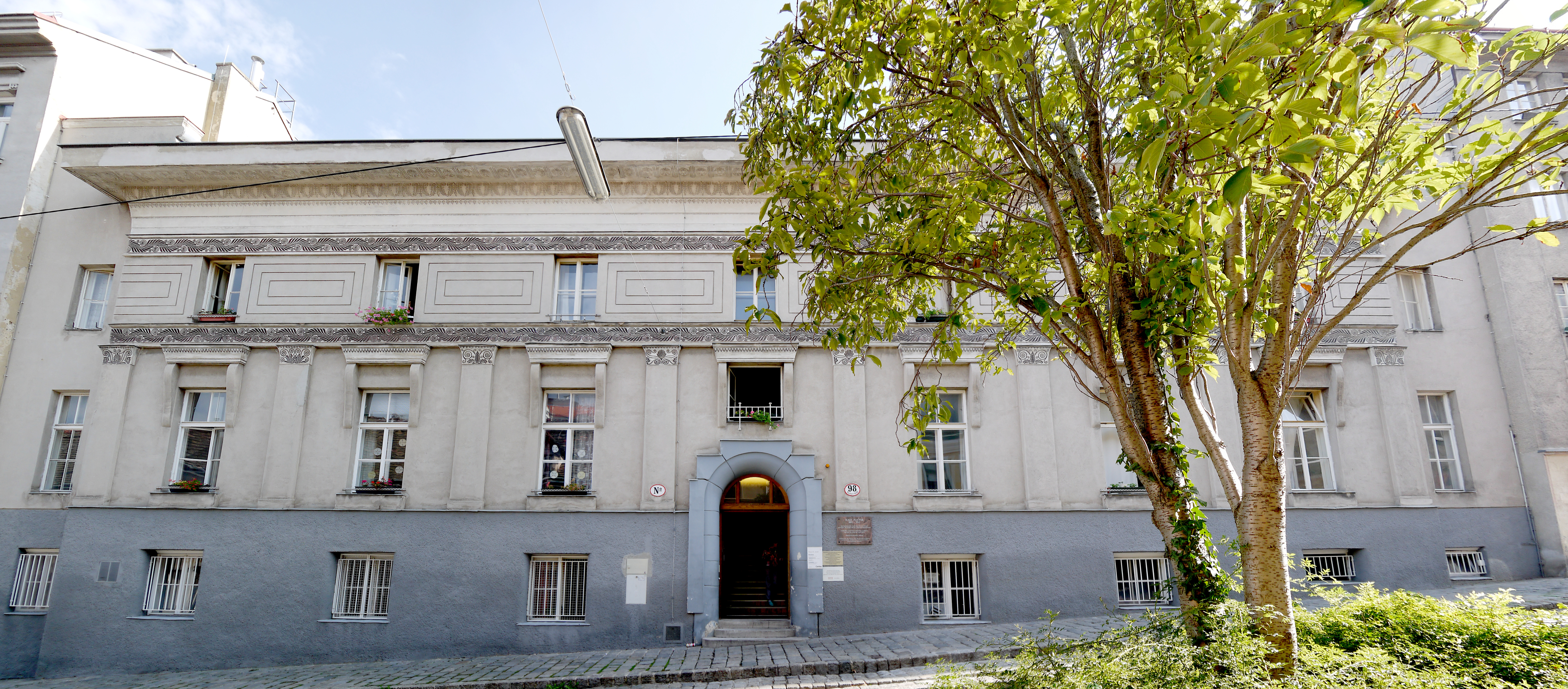
Lacknergasse 98 (1907)

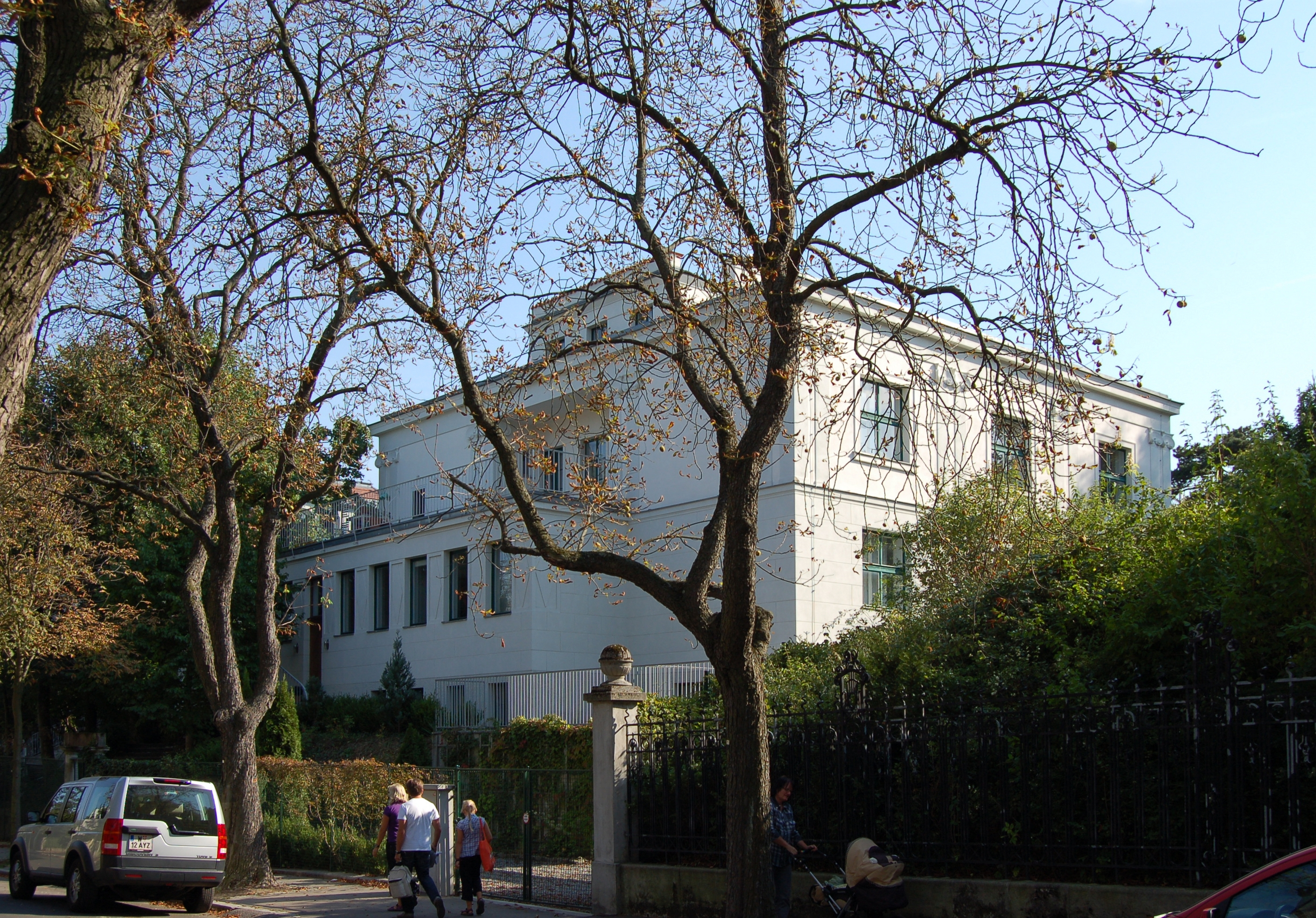
Villa Graßberger (1908)

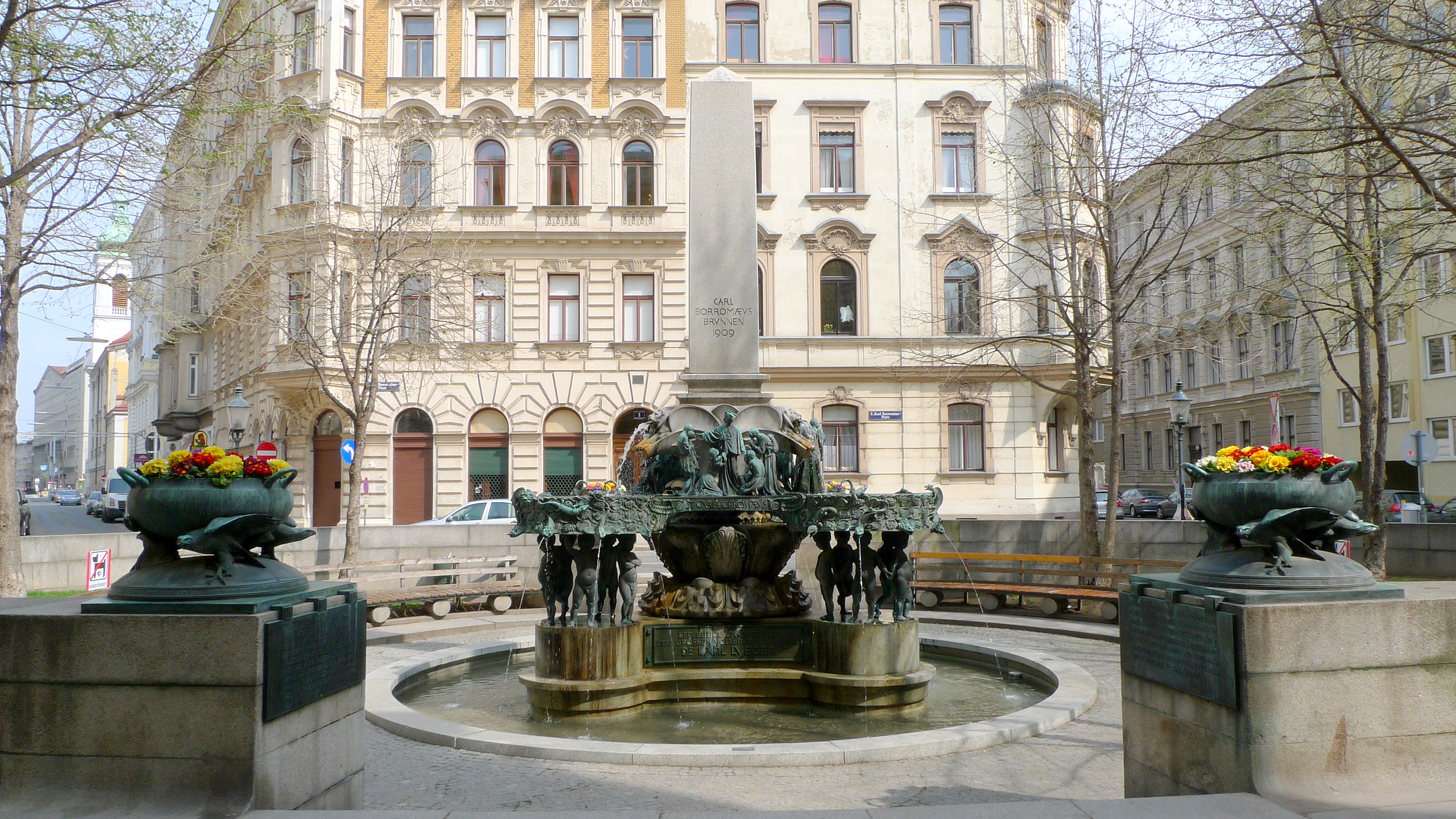
Borromaeus fountain (1909)

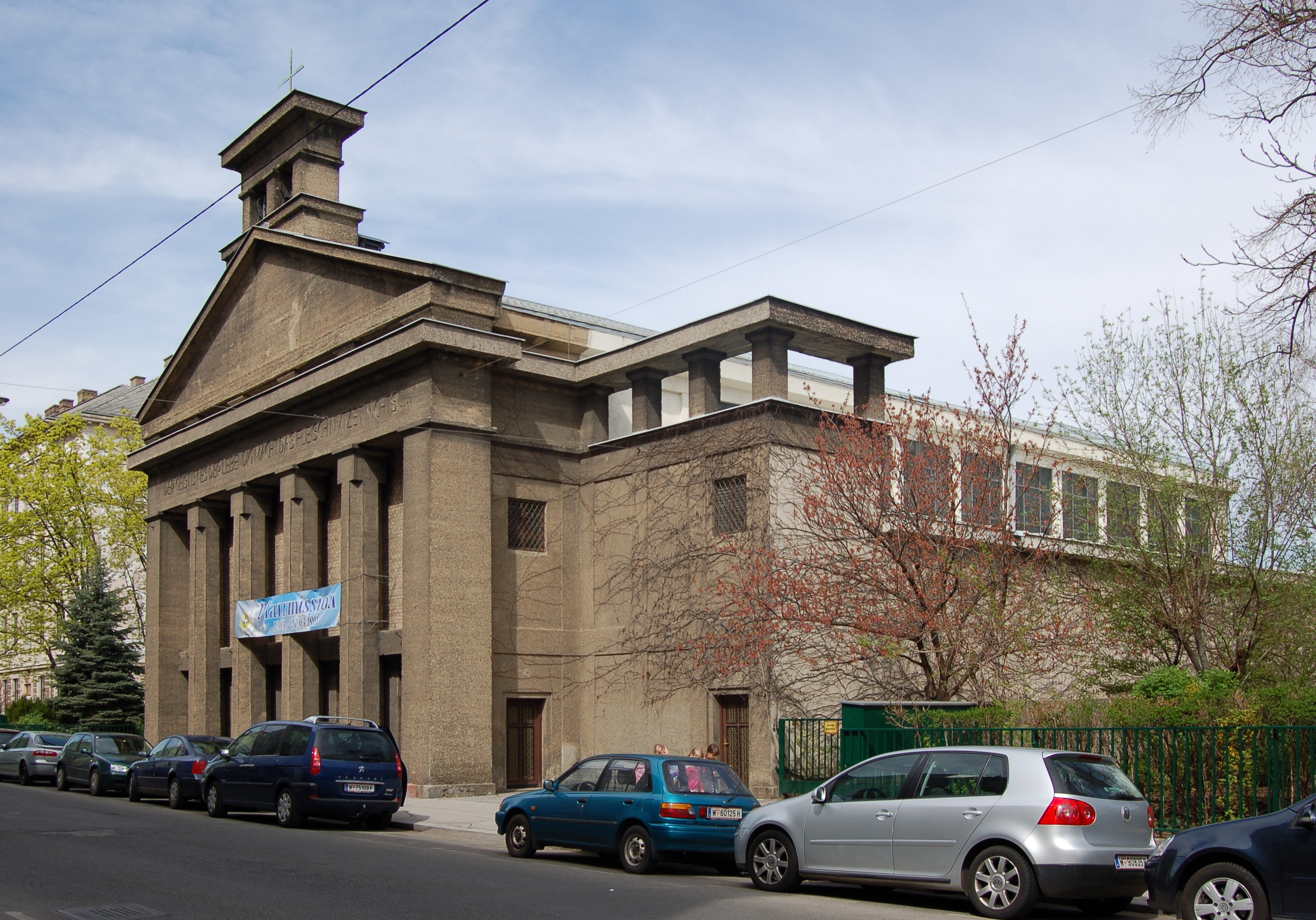
Herbststraße 82 (1913)

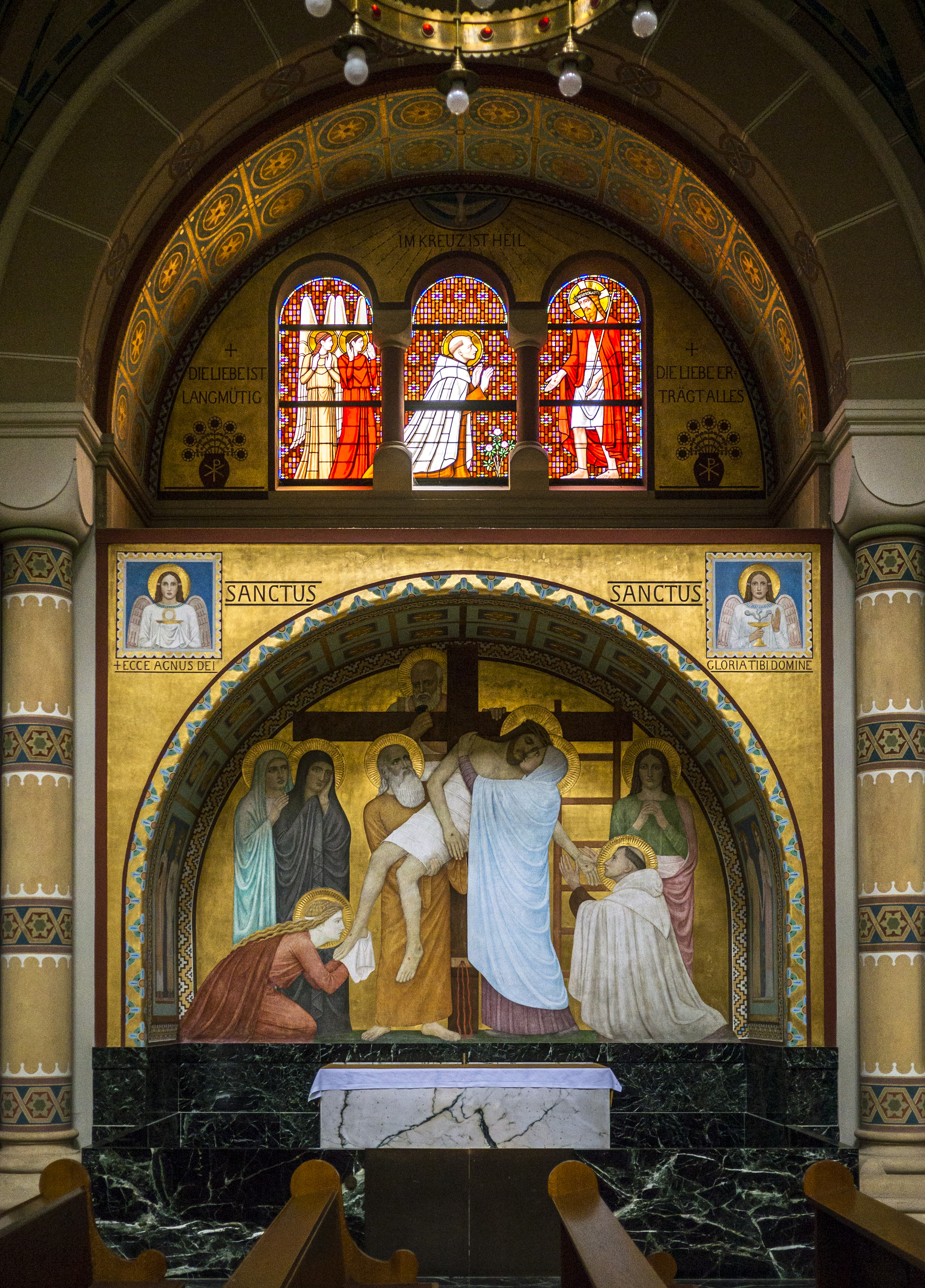
Silbergasse 35 (1915)

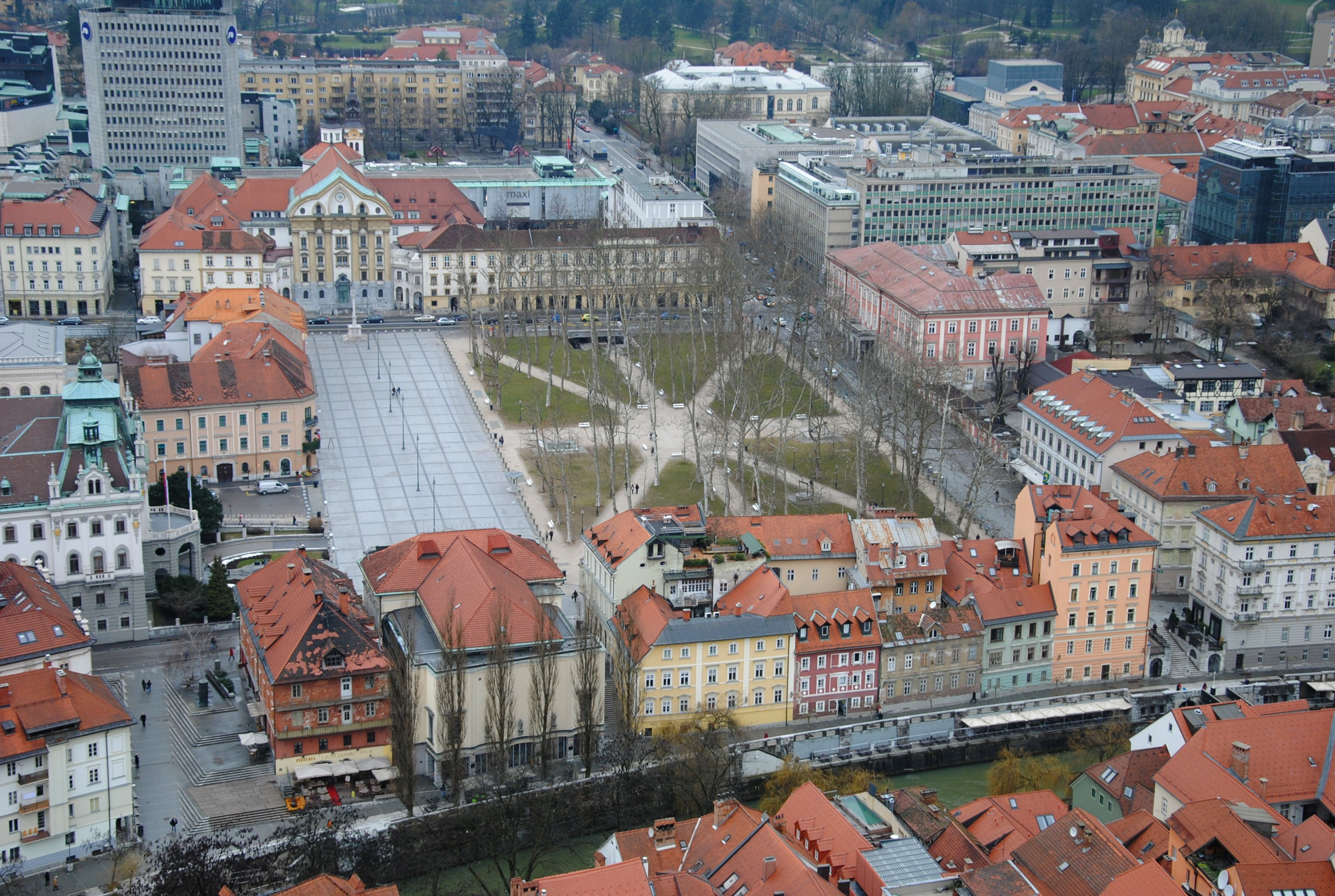
Congress Square, Ljubljana (1928)

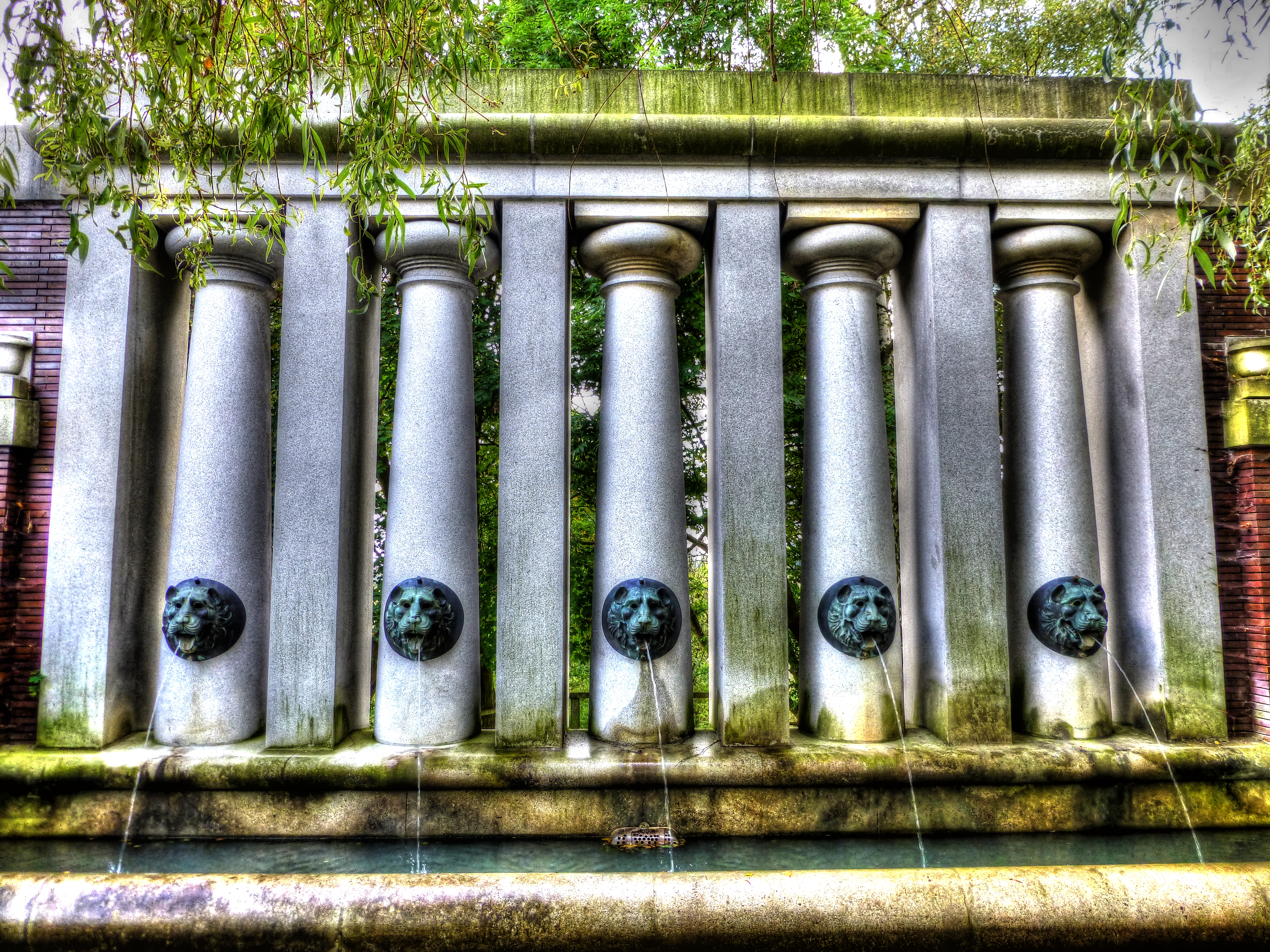
Fountain at Lány Castle (1930)

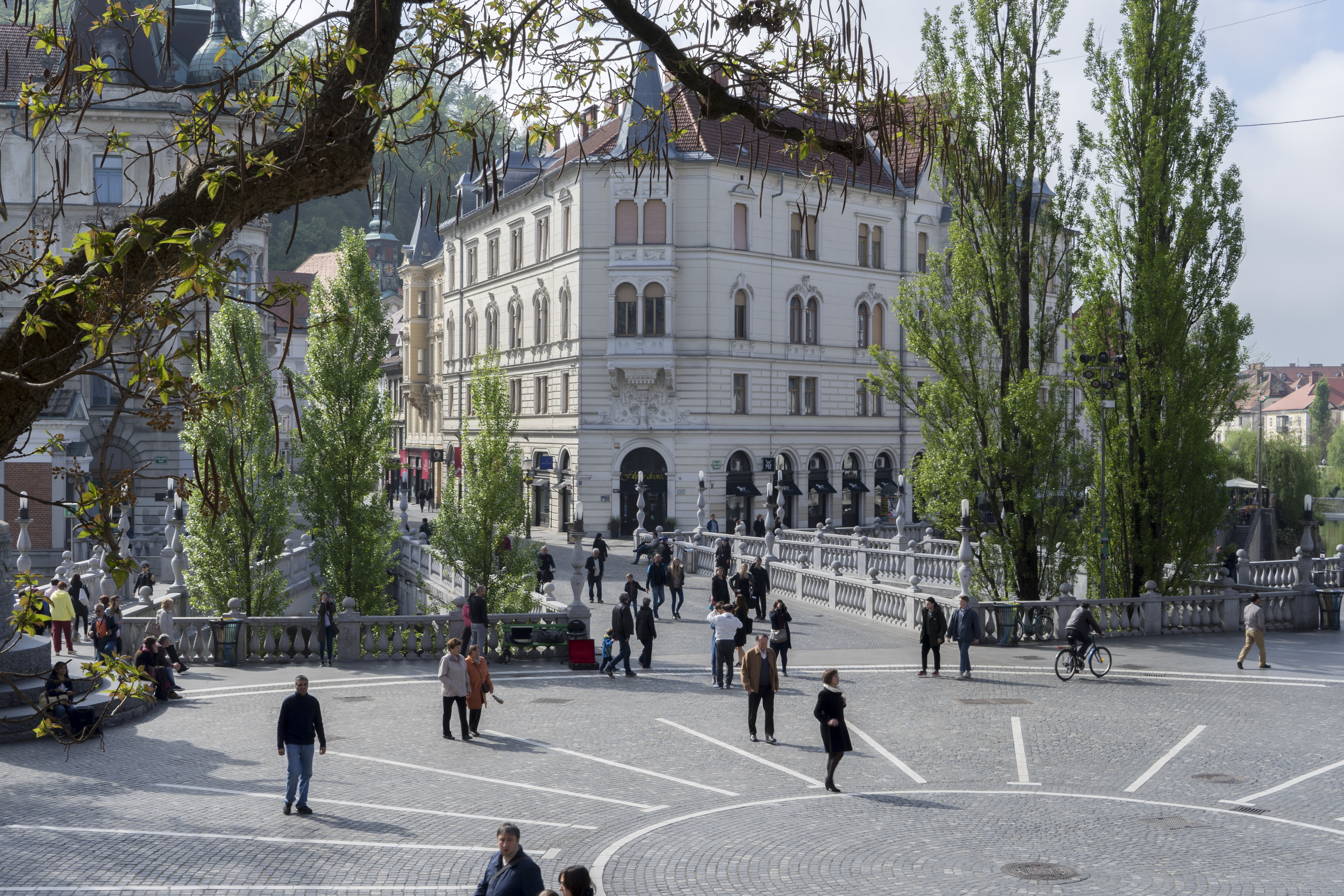
Triple Bridge extension (1931)

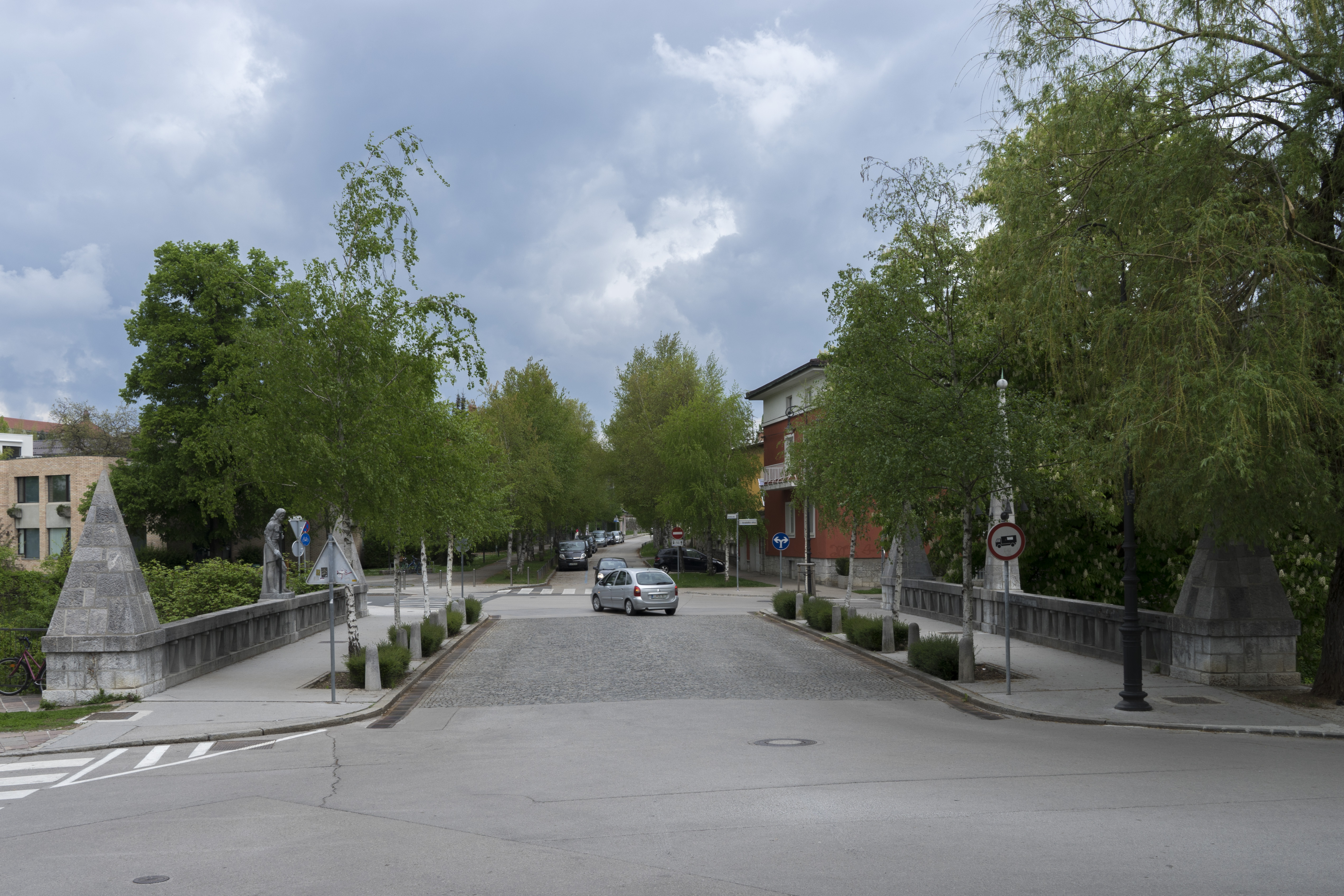
Trnovo Bridge (1931)

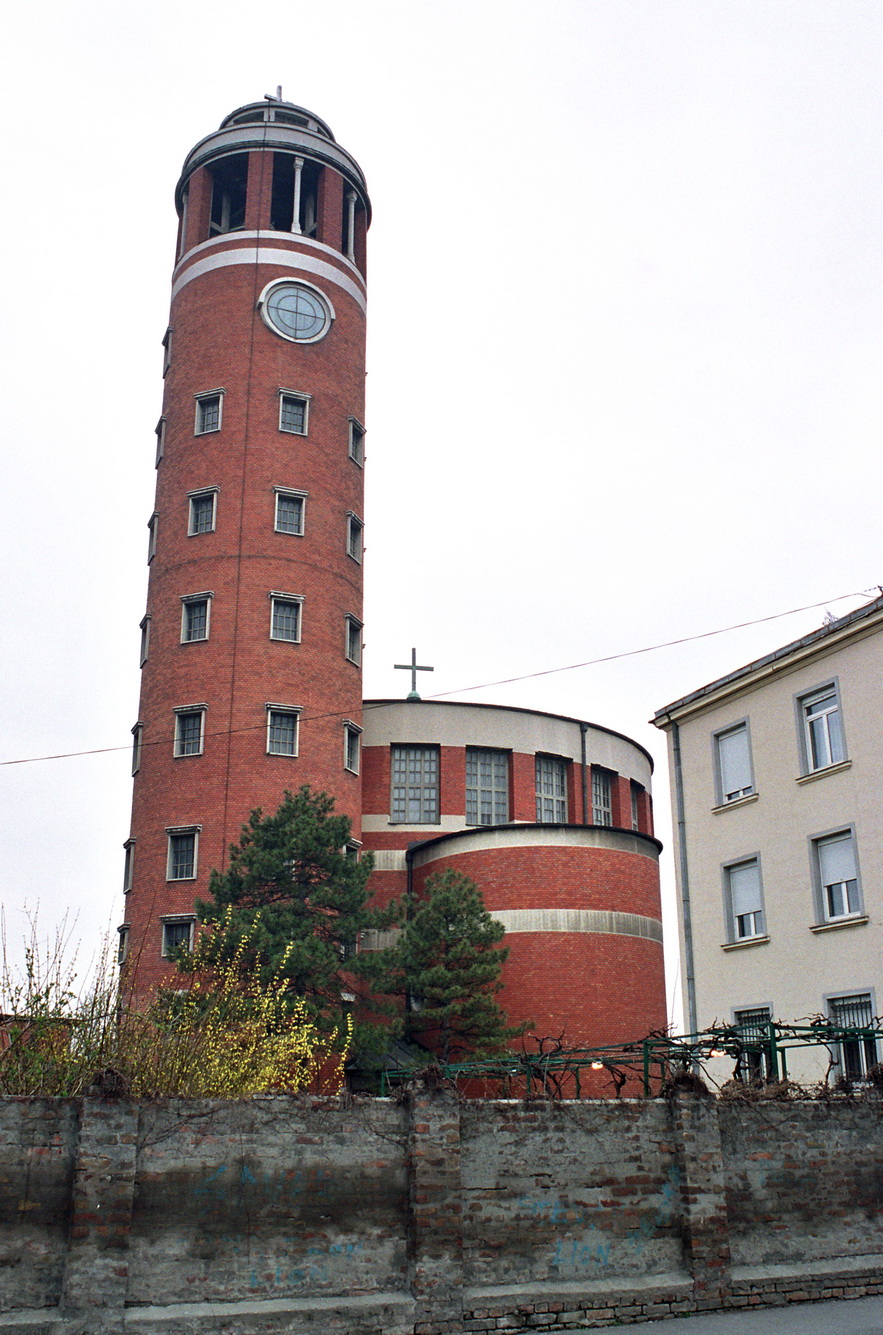
Church of St. Anthony of Padua, Belgrade (1932)

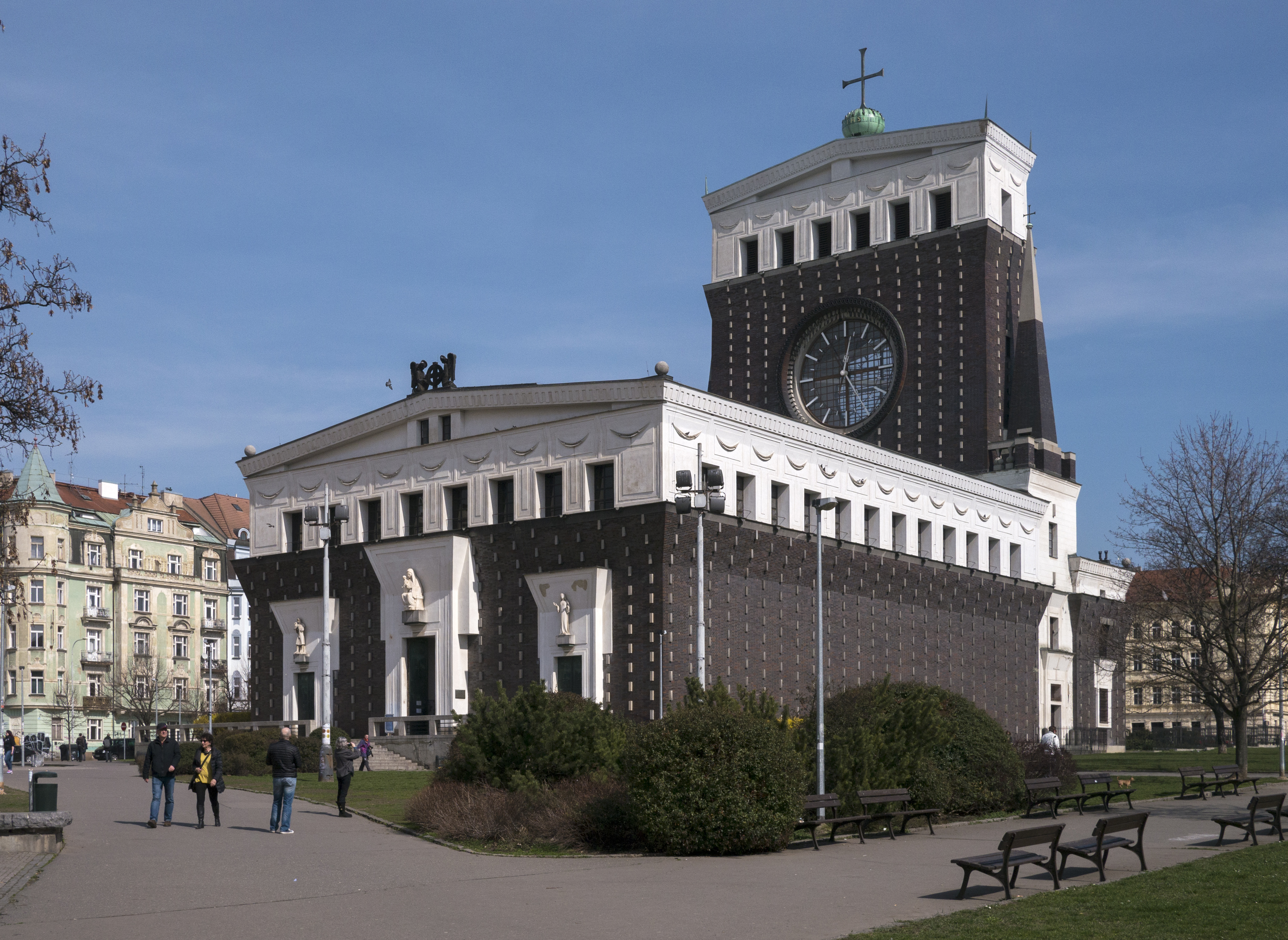
Church of the Most Sacred Heart of Our Lord, Prague (1932)

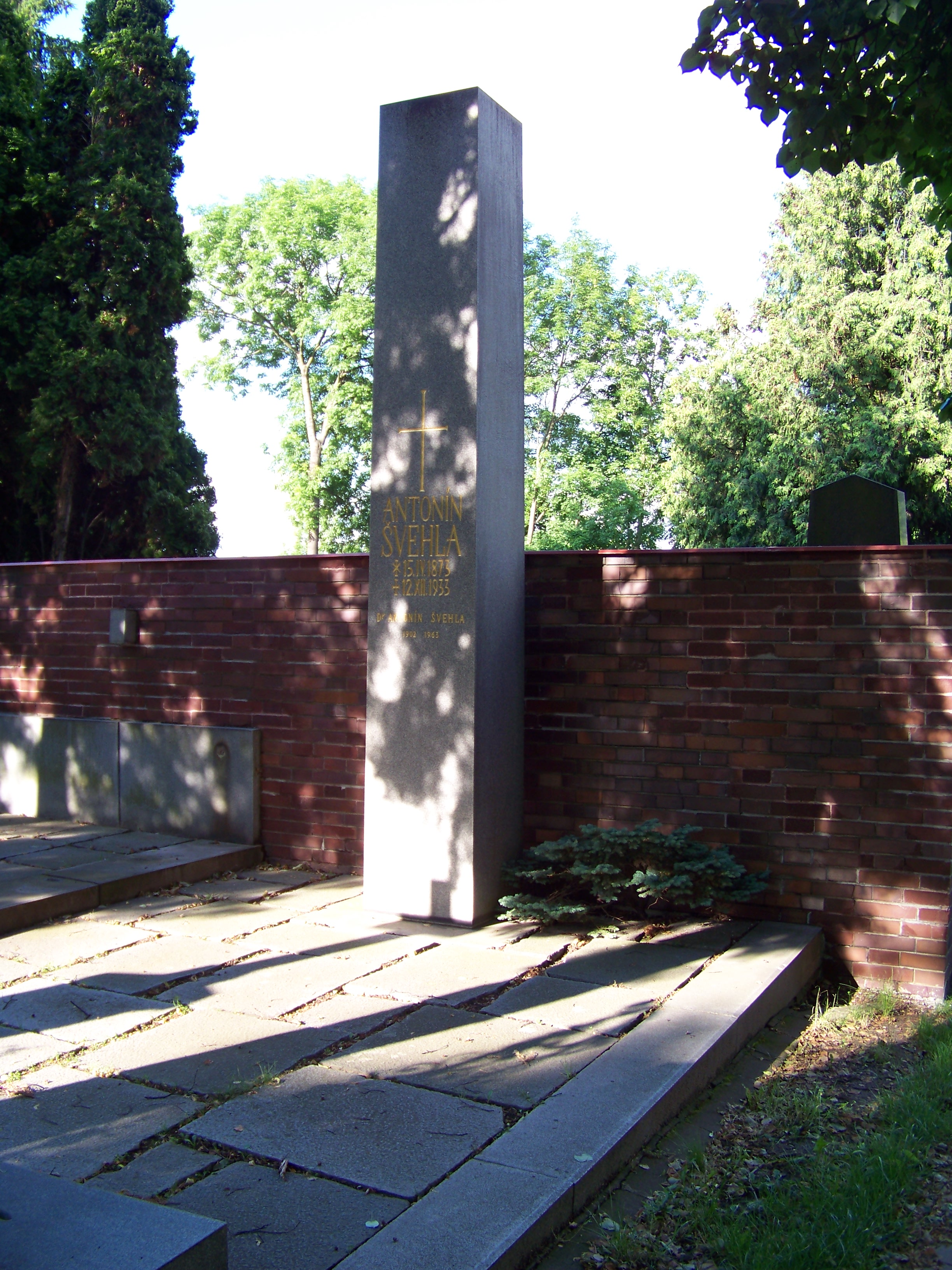
Tomb for Antonín Švehla (1933)

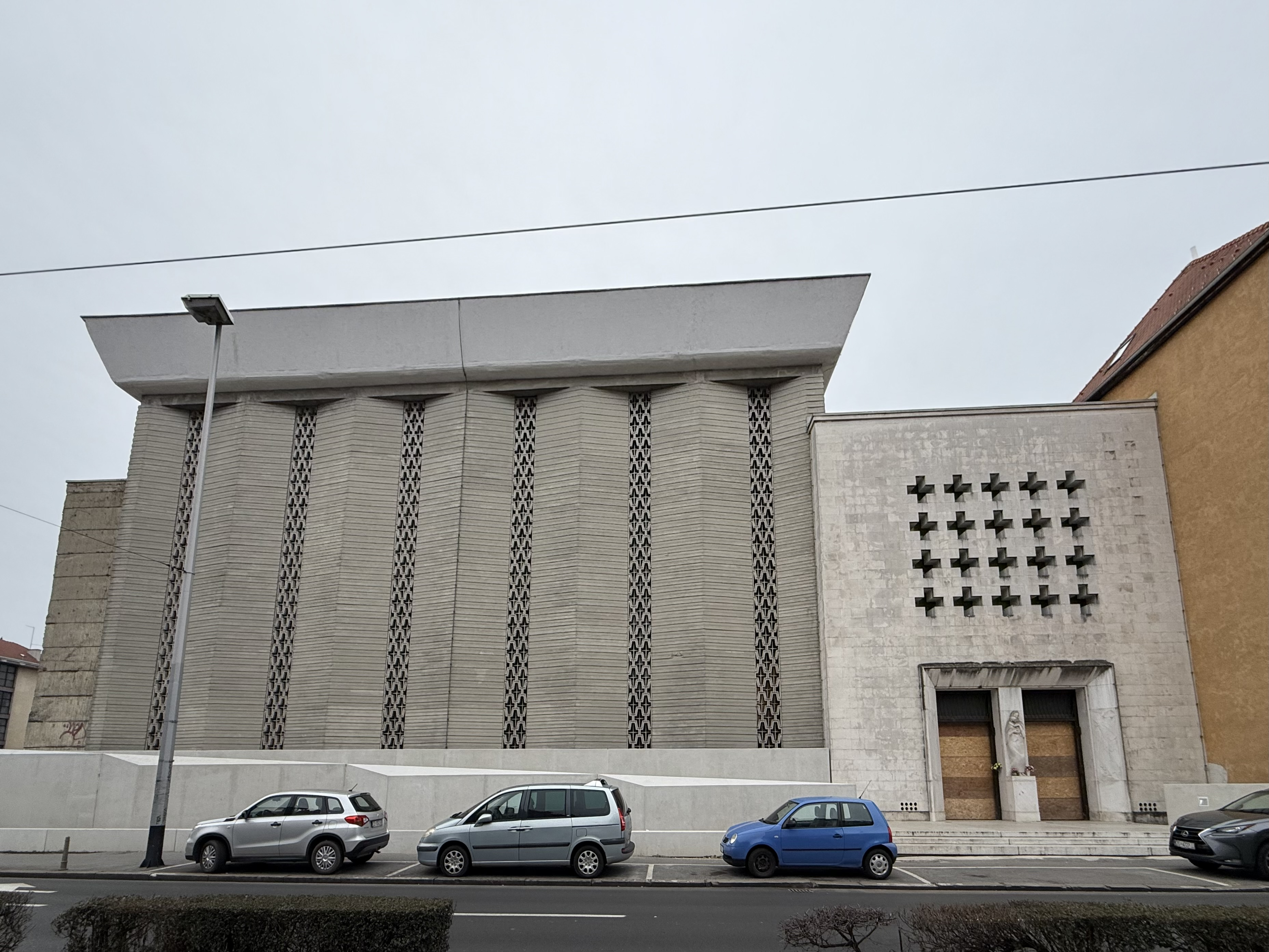
Church of Mary of Lourdes, Zagreb (1934)

Jožamurka (1939)

National and University Library of Slovenia (1941)

Ljubljanica Sluice Gate (1944)

== Prague Castle ==
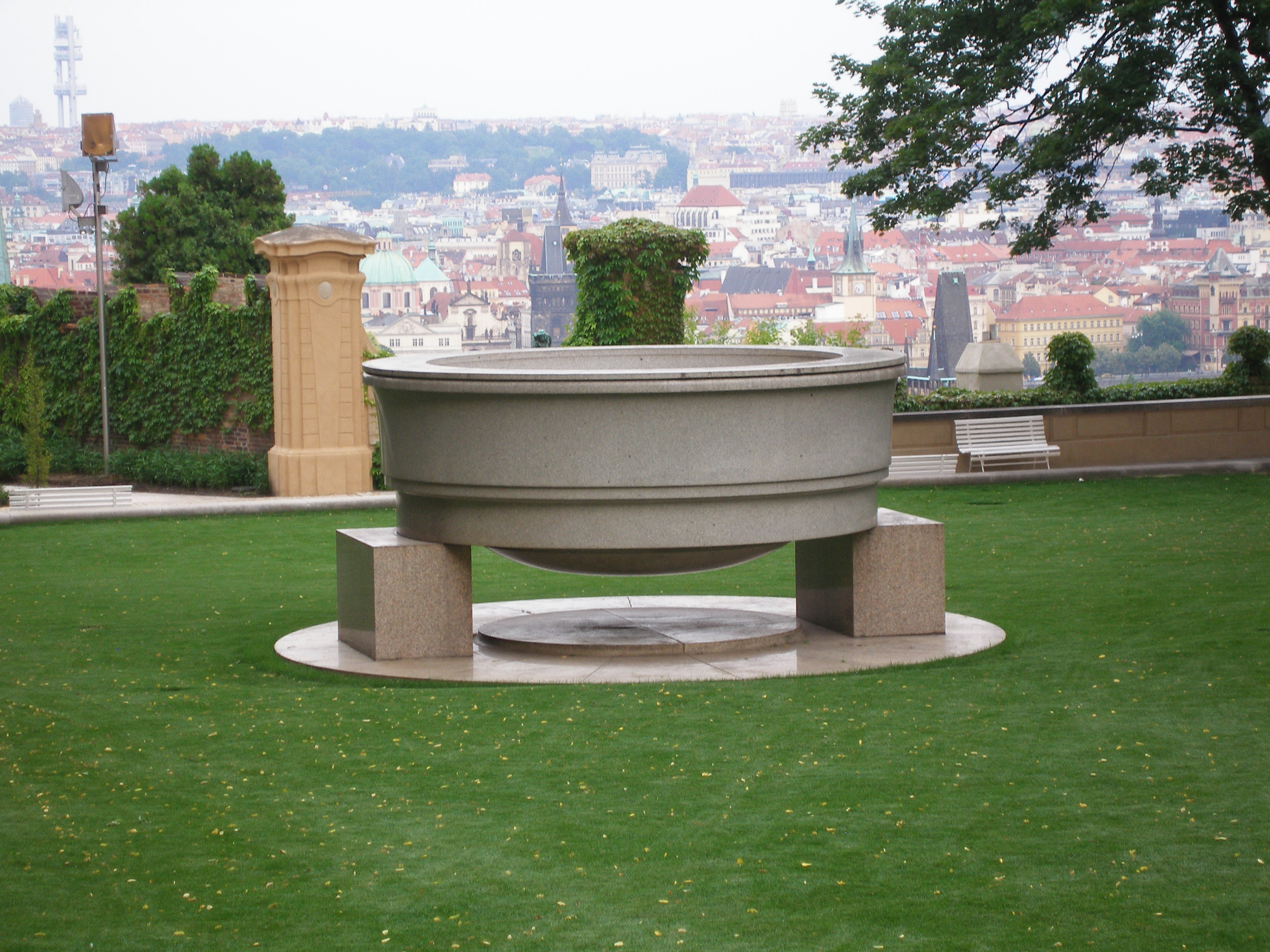
The Garden of Paradise (1925)

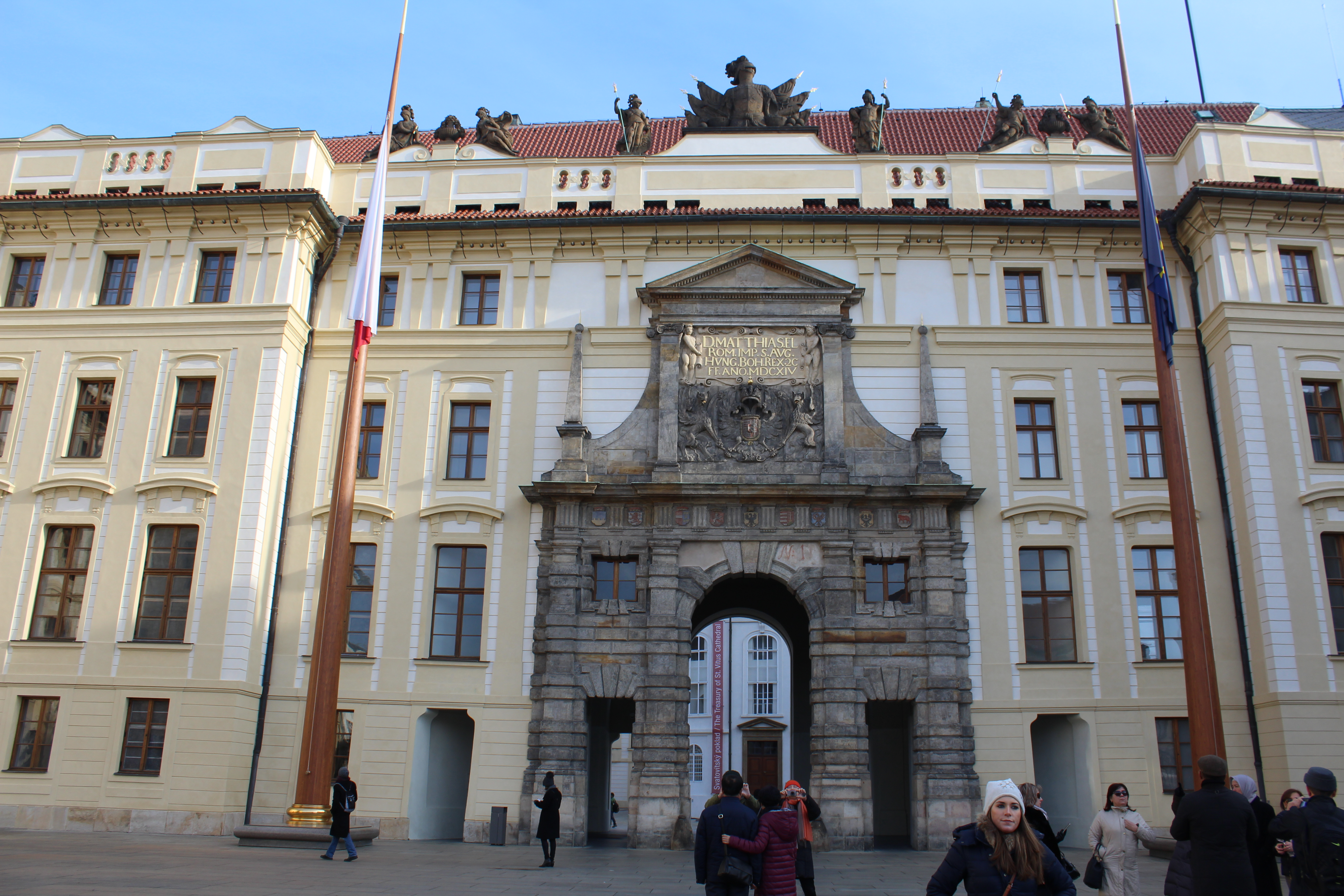
Flagpoles in front of the Matthiastor (1926)

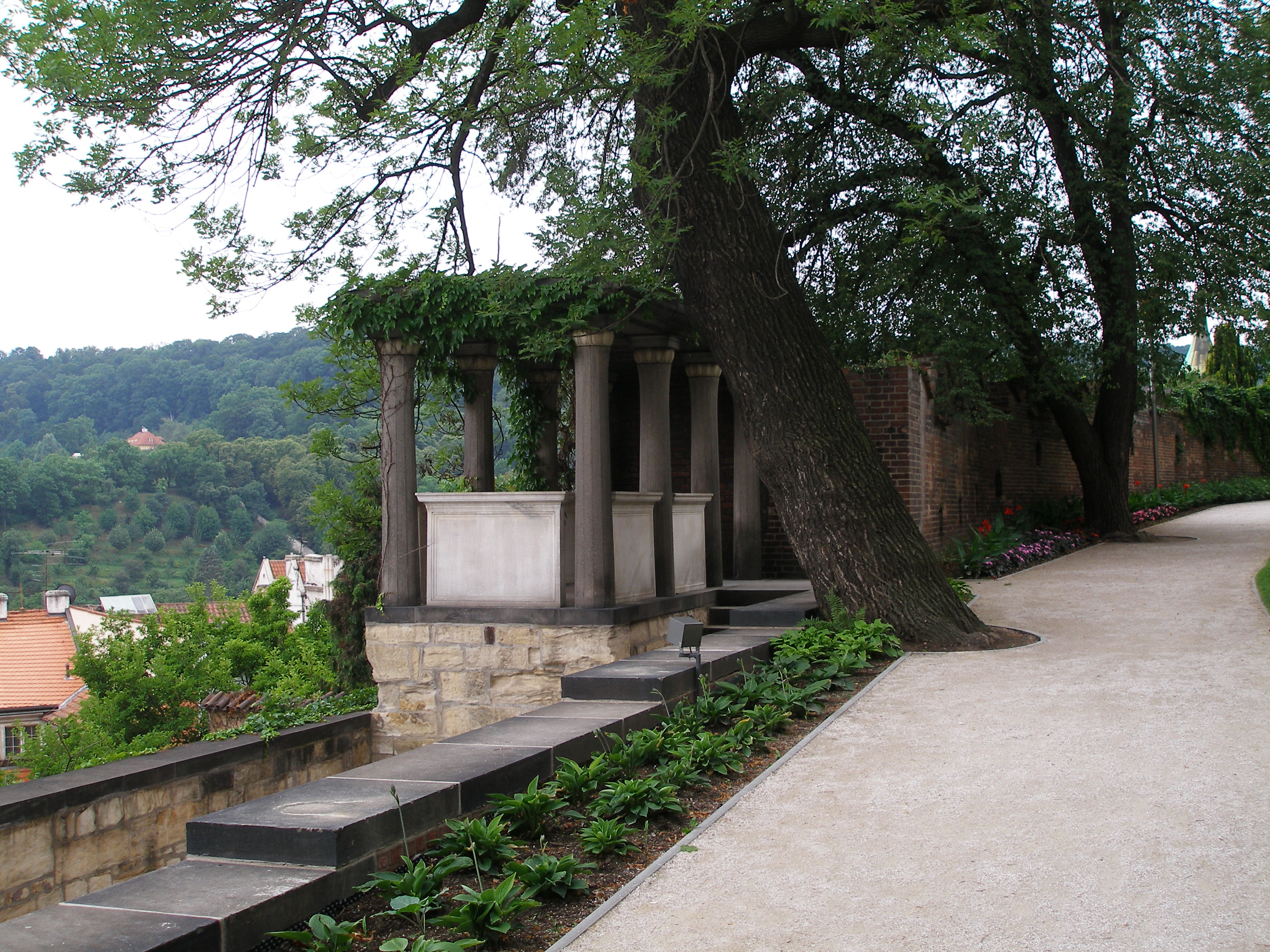
Observation platform (1927)

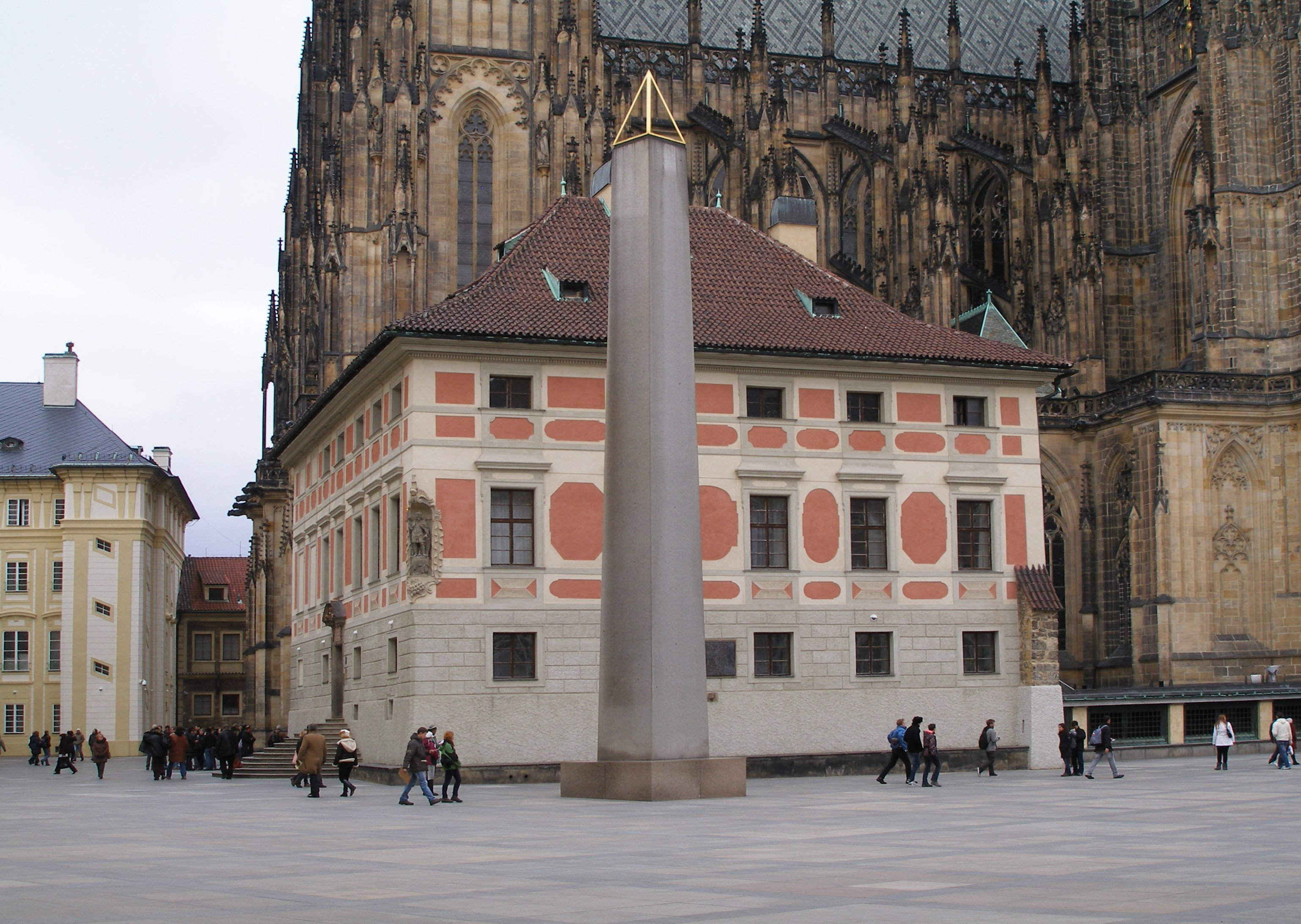
Third courtyard and obelisk (1928)

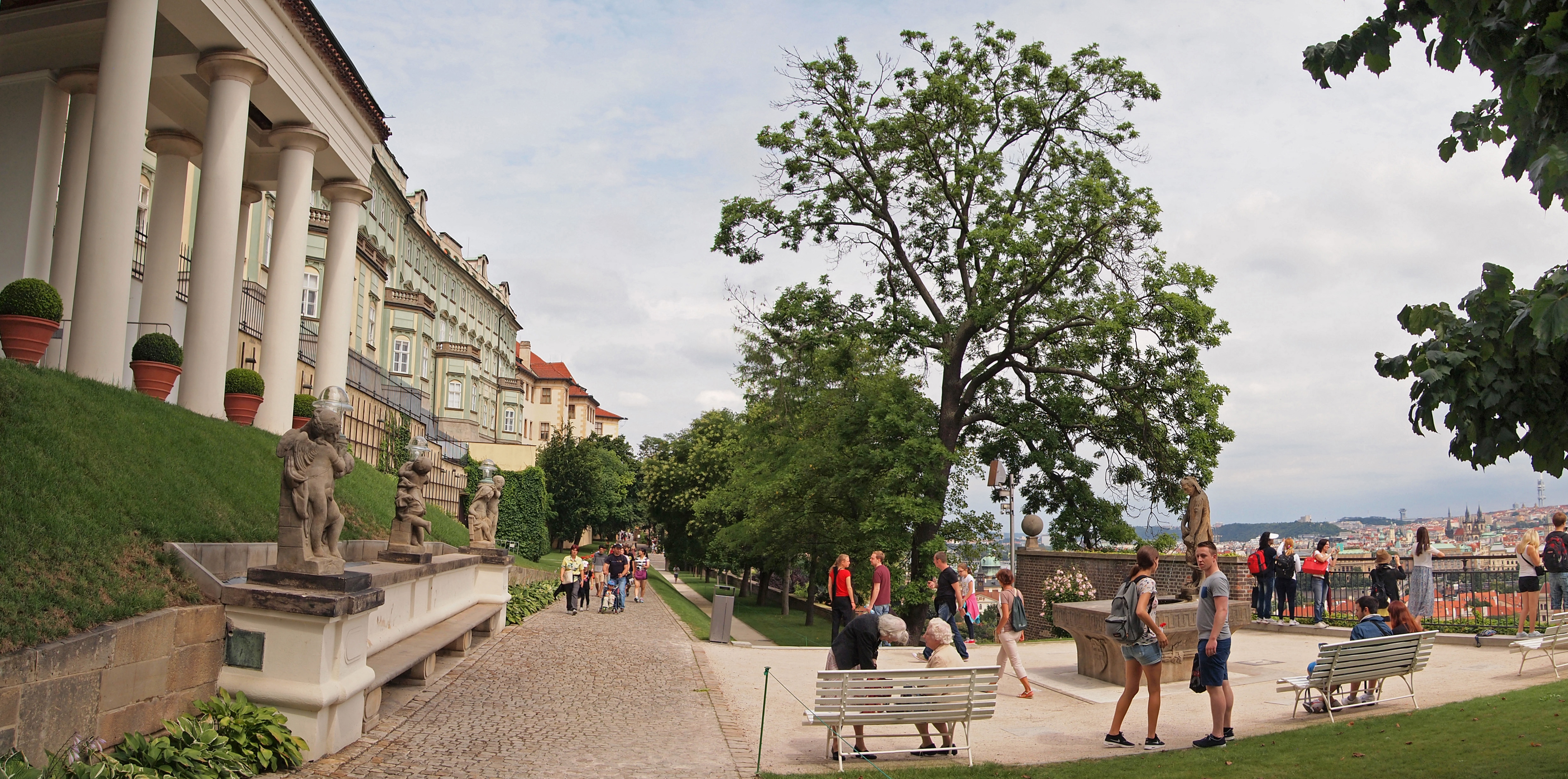
Wall garden (1928)

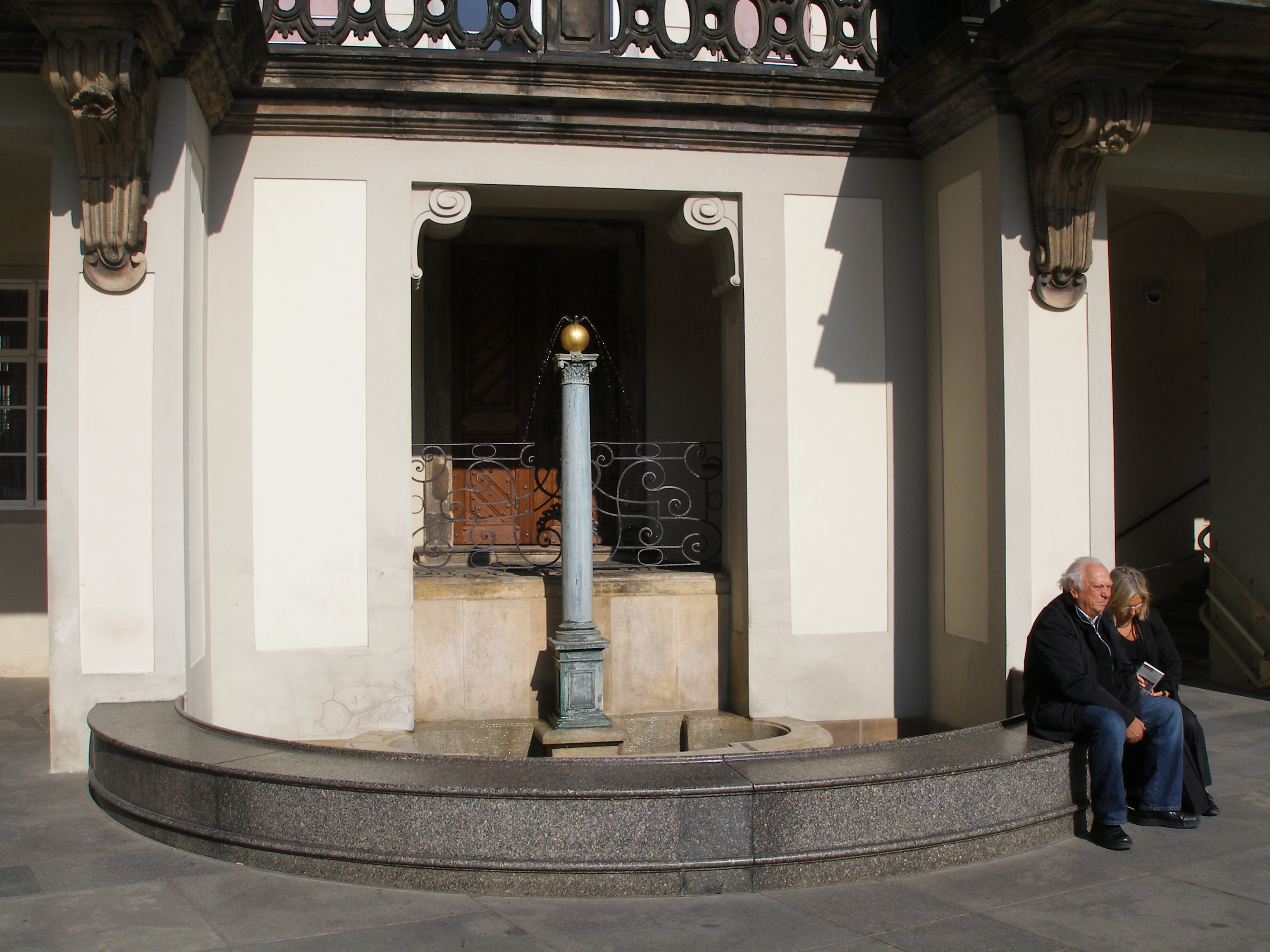
Fountain (1928)

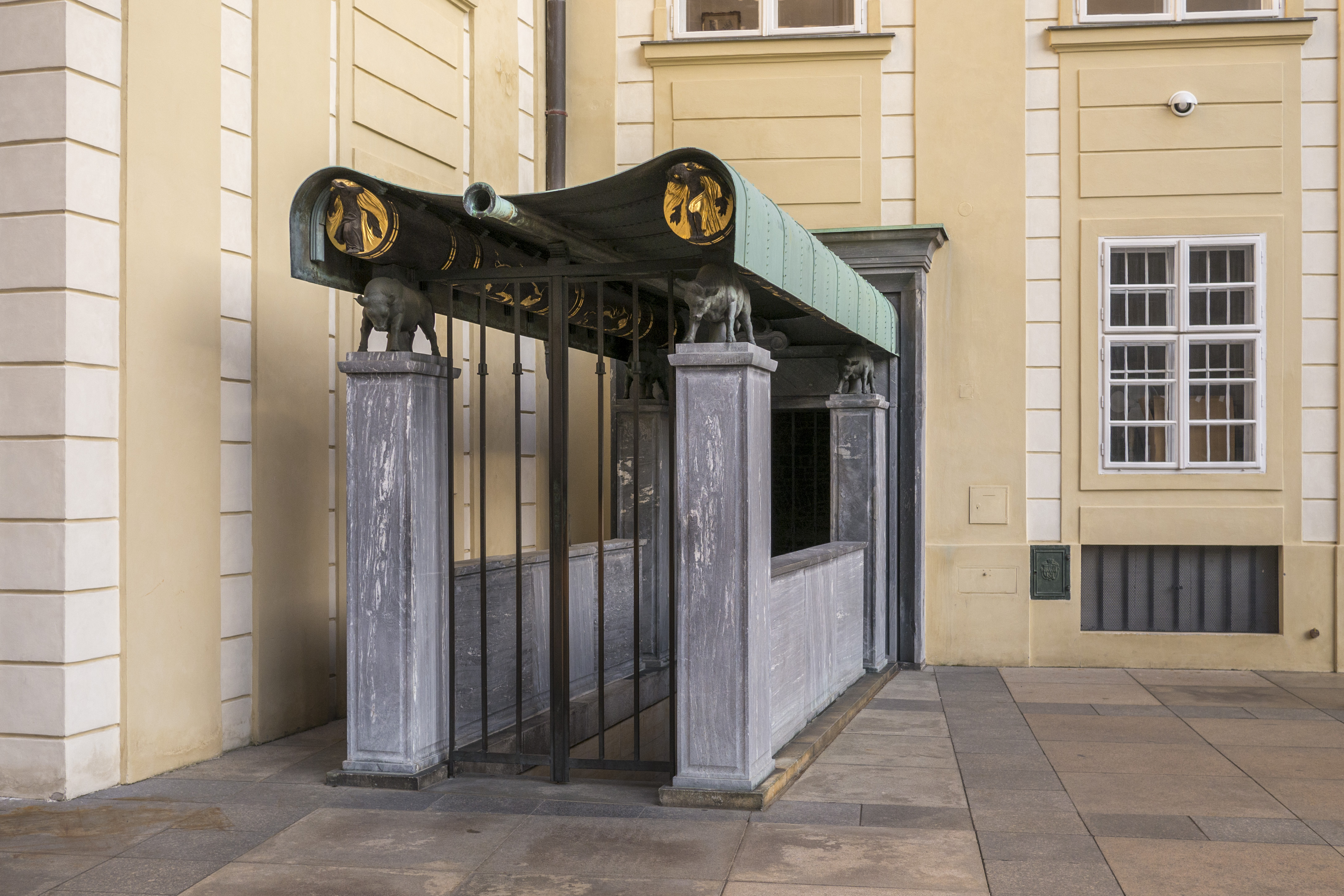
Stairway (1931)

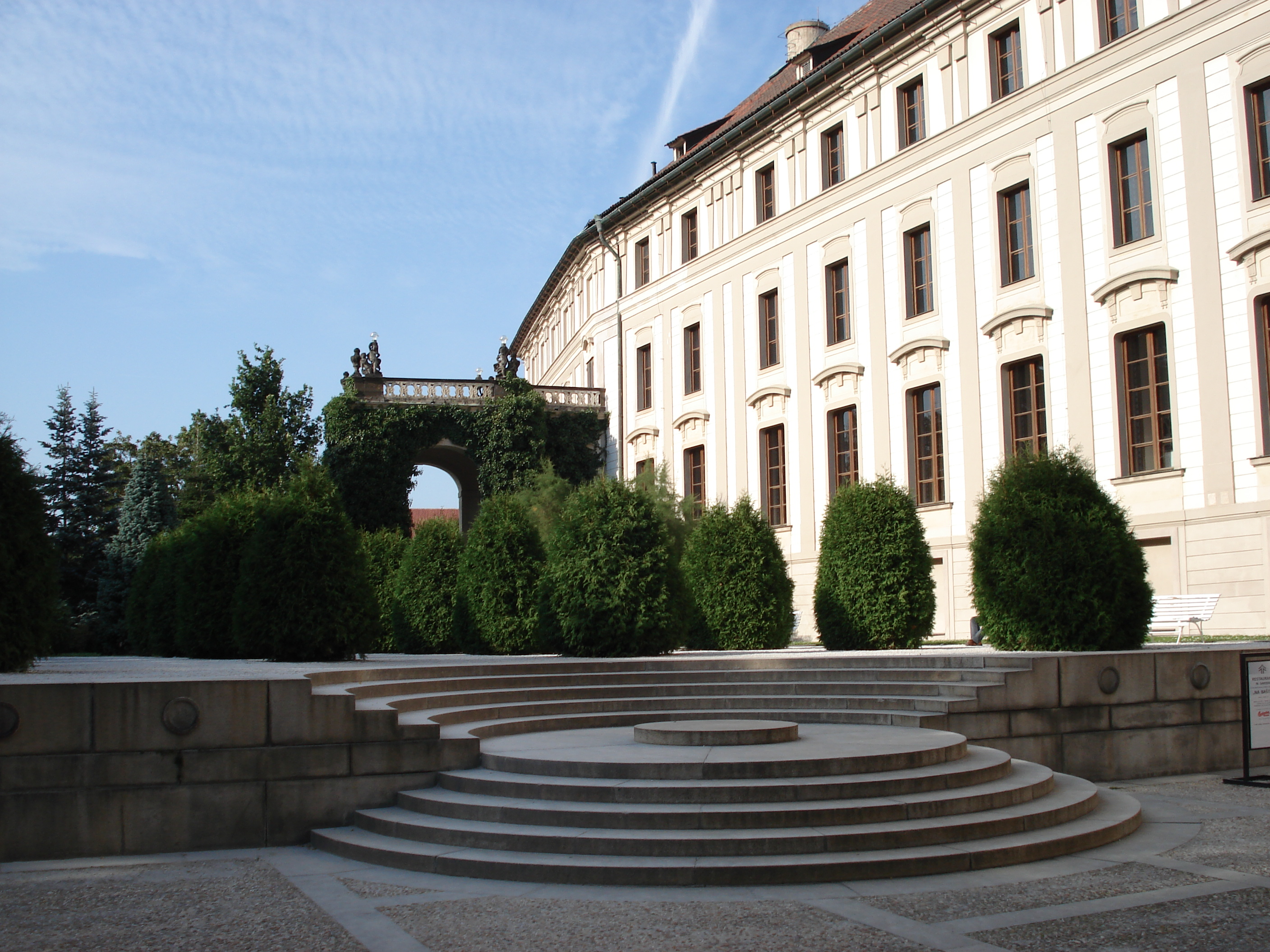
Stairway (1932)

== See also ==
- Max Fabiani
- Ivan Vurnik
