= Republic Square (Ljubljana) =

Square in Ljubljana, Slovenia

- Trg republike (Slovene)
- Revolution Square
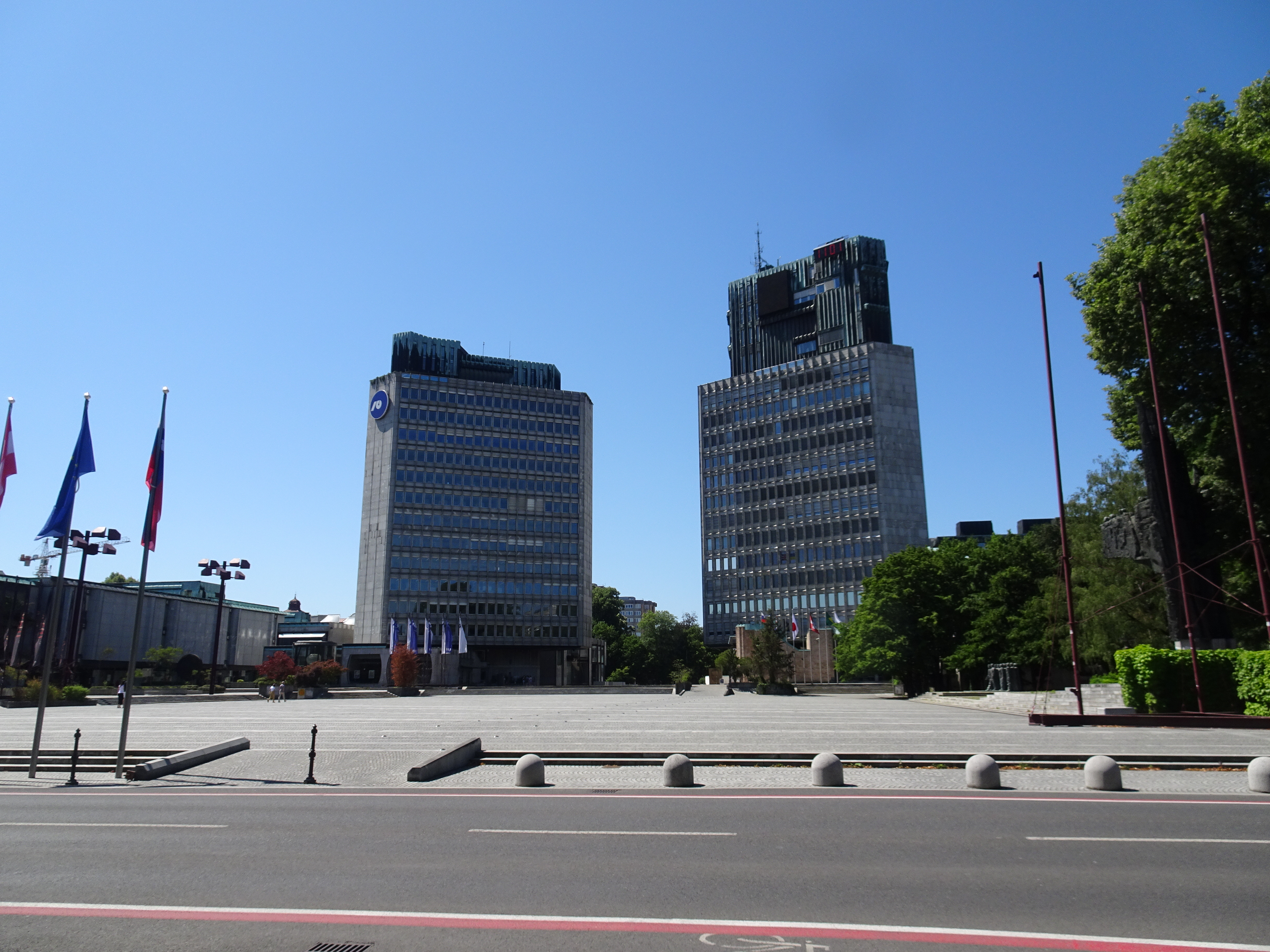
- Republic Square as viewed from the road at the National Assembly Building of Slovenia, with the Trg Republike 2, housing the Nova Ljubljanska banka and the higher tower number 3, as well as to the left the department store Maxi
- Interactive map of Republic Square
- 46°3′2.69″N 14°30′1.28″E
- Location: (Slovenia) Ljubljana

History
- Built: 1960

Site notes
- Architect: Edvard Ravnikar

Republic Square or Square of the Republic (Slovene: Trg republike), at first named Revolution Square, is the largest square in Ljubljana, the capital of Slovenia. It was designed in the second half of the 20th century by Edvard Ravnikar. Independence of Slovenia was declared here on 26 June 1991. The National Assembly Building stands at its northern side and Cankar Hall at the southern side. In the 2010s the square was converted from a parking space to a pedestrian space.

== History ==
Revolution Square was built in 1960 as part of a competition to design a place to erect a monument to the Yugoslav National Liberation War and Socialist Revolution. The design was changed to reduce the height of the towers and to include a conference centre amongst the open plan square. The monument was not removed following independence in contrast to surrounding former Yugoslav countries that usually removed communist memorials and statues after their independence.

In 1991, following the Slovenian independence referendum and despite the Socialist Republic of Slovenia negotiating with the Socialist Federal Republic of Yugoslavia to change the union into a confederation, the independence of Slovenia was declared in Republic Square. It was also renamed Republic Square as a result. Slovenian Statehood Day celebrations were held in Republic Square for the first five years but following a 5th anniversary military parade, the official celebrations were moved from Republic Square to Cankar Centre (Cankarjev dom). Though they were later moved back to Republic Square. Despite its significance in Slovenian statehood, it was predominantly used as a car park. In 2014, the Urban Municipality of Ljubljana renovated it to make it pedestrianised whilst the Government of Slovenia declared it a monument of national importance. It was proposed that a new monument to Slovenian independence be erected in Republic Square to unite people.
