= Golden Crescent Award =

The Al-Hilal Golden Award or Golden Crescent Award (Arabic: جائزة الهلال الذهبي) is an annual ceremony named by that name because it is held annually in the month of Ramadan, and it is considered one of the most important occasions that are held to honor the best Iraqi dramas and programs that are displayed during the month of Ramadan on Iraqi satellite channels. The author of the idea of Golden Crescent Award is the journalist Haider Alnuaimi. The first was in 2019 and was named after the late artist, Rasim Al-Jumaili. The award included ten fields in the best category, which are: best actor, best actress, best young actor, best young actress, best program, best title, best title singer, best director, best screenplay, best work. The events of the ceremony, which was attended by a large group of Iraqi artists, media figures, government figures and businessmen, took place at the Babylon Hotel in Baghdad. As for its second session, it was held in 2020 in the name of the Iraqi artist Bahjat Al-Jubouri, and it was held at the Babel Hotel in Baghdad as well.

== Selection and voting process ==
In the first edition, 50% of the vote was approved for the jury and the other 50% for the online vote. In its second edition, the percentage was changed to 40% for the online voting and 60% for the jury.

== Awards ==
=== First edition ===
- Best work: Love of Baghdad (Hawa Baghdad).
- Best director: Muhaned Abu Khumra (Arabic: مهند أبو خمرة), for the work of Love of Baghdad (Hawa Baghdad)
- Best scenario: Muhaned Abu Khumra (Arabic: مهند أبو خمرة), on the work of Love of Baghdad (Hawa Baghdad)
- Best title: The title of the series Love of Baghdad (Hawa Baghdad)
- Best actor: Ayad Radhi (Arabic: اياد راضي), for his role in Shalea Qalaa (Arabic: شلع قلع)
- Best actress: Alaa Hussein, for her role in the act of Sweet Sour (Hamidh Hylo) (Arabic: حامض حلو)
- Best young actor: appeared with American actor Esser West (Arabic: آسر ويست) for his role in the work of Love of Baghdad, and Khaled Omran for his role in the work of Sweet Sour (Hamidh Hylo)(Arabic: حامض حلو)
- Best young actress: Zahraa Habib, for her role in the work of Love of Baghdad
- Best TV show: Dhay Al-Kamar (Arabic: ضي الكمر), presented by the poet Ma'mun al-Nattah
- Best title vocalist: Hatem Al Iraqi, on the work of Al-Ardhalji (Arabic: العرضحالجي)

=== Second edition ===
- Best work: General Anesthesia (Banch A’am)
- Best director: Ali Fadel
- Best scenario: Mustafa Al-Rikabi
- Best actor: Mahmoud Abu Abbas
- Best actress: Shatha Salem
- Best young actor: Hussein Ajaj
- Best young actress: Shorouk El Hassan
- Best TV show: The White Army (Al-Jayesh Al-A’abyedh), presented by Ali al-Khalidi
- Best title vocalist: Mohamed Abdul Jabbar
- Best TV sport program: 3 one, Taha Abu Ragheef.
