= List of magazines in Slovenia =

The first magazine for women, Slovenka (Slovenian Woman), was published in Slovenia in 1896. During the 1960s the literary magazines played a significant role in Slovenia's liberalization. There were 29 weekly magazines, 24 biweekly magazines, and 226 monthly magazines in 1988.

In 2004 there were nearly 1,000 print media in Slovenia, including newspapers, magazines and journals. In addition to local magazines, the Slovenian versions of foreign magazine titles, such as Playboy, Elle and Men’s Health, are also distributed in the country.

The following is an incomplete list of current and defunct magazines published in Slovenia. It also covers those magazines before the independence of the country. They may be published in Slovenian or in other languages.

== A ==
- Anja
- Avtomanija
- Avenija

== B ==
- Bravo
- Bukla

== D ==
- Demokracija
- Dialogi
- Dolenjski list
- Dom in svet
- Družina

== F ==
- Finance Trendi
- Flaneur

== H ==
- Hopla

== I ==
- In YourPocket
- It's Psychedelic Baby! Magazine

== J ==
- Jana
- Joker
- Hallmark Film Television

== K ==
- Kmečki glas

== L ==
- Lady
- Literati
- Ljubljanski zvon

== M ==
- Mag
- Mladina
- MM Slovenija
- Moj mikro
- Moje finance

== N ==
- Naša kronika
- Naša žena
- Nedeljski dnevnik
- Nova revija

== O ==
- Obrazi

== P ==
- Planinski Vestnik

== R ==
- Računalniške novice
- Razpotja
- Reporter
- RSQ

== S ==
- The Slovenia Times
- Slovenski glasnik
- Sodobnost
- Stripburger

== Z ==
- Življenje in tehnika

== See also ==
- List of newspapers in Slovenia
- List of Slovene newspapers
