= Mag =

Mag, MAG, Mags or mags may refer to:

== Arts, entertainment and media ==
- MAG (video game), released in 2010
- Mág (film), a 1988 Czech film
- Mag (Slovenian magazine), published from 1995 to 2010
- Mag, a playable character from Warframe
- Mag, a playable character from Evolution: The World of Sacred Device

== Businesses and organisations ==
- MacKenzie Art Gallery, Regina, Saskatchewan, Canada
- Manchester Airport Holdings, trading as MAG, a British holding company
- Maricopa Association of Governments, the regional agency for the greater Maricopa region in Arizona, U.S.
- Mines Advisory Group, a non-governmental organization
- MAG motorcycle engines, manufactured by Motosacoche
- Hungarian General Machine Factory (Magyar Általános Gépgyár, MÁG), a former automobile and aircraft manufacturer

== Military ==
- a United States Marine Corps aviation group
- FN MAG, a machine gun
- MAG-7, a shotgun

== People ==
- Maumoon Abdul Gayoom (born 1937) President of the Maldives from 1978 to 2008
- Mag Bodard (1916–2019), Italian-born French film producer
- Mags Darcy (born 1987), Irish camogie player
- Mags Harries (born 1945), Welsh-American artist
- Mags McCarthy (born 1989 or 1990), Irish country music singer
- Mags Murray (1961–2020), Irish politician
- Mags Portman (1974–2019), British medical doctor
- Gallus Mag, nickname of a notorious 19th century female bouncer in New York City
- Mags, stage name of Magne Furuholmen (born 1962), Norwegian musician and visual artist
- Mag (music producer), American record producer

== Places ==
- Mag, a village near Săliște, Sibiu County, Romania
  - Mag (river)
- Madagascar, UNDP country code MAG

== Science and technology ==
- Magnesium alloy wheels, commonly called "mags"
- Magnetometer, sometimes abbreviated "mag"
- Magnitude (astronomy), abbreviated "mag" as a measure of brightness of an object in the sky
- Male accessory gland, in human biology
- Maximum Absorbency Garment, a diaper-like garment worn by astronauts
- Metagenomic-assembled genomes (MAGs), commonly used in metagenomic binning
- Metal active gas welding
- Myelin-associated glycoprotein

== Other uses ==
- Mount Albert Grammar School (MAGS), Auckland, New Zealand
- Magnology, or The MAG, a community convention in Germany
- Hag and Mag, demons in Mandaeism
- Men's artistic gymnastics
- Madang Airport, Papua New Guinea, IATA airport code MAG
- Mag., an abbreviation of Magister
- ISO 639-2 code for the Magahi language
- MAG mini truck, a captive import utility truck better known as the Hafei Ruiyi

== See also ==
- Magazine (disambiguation)
- Maggie (disambiguation)
