= Hawa Baghdad =

Iraqi TV series

- هوى بغداد
- Genre: TV Show
- Created by: Muhaned Abu Khumra
- Developed by: Muhaned Abu Khumra
- Country of origin: Iraq
- Original language: Arabic
- No. of seasons: 1
- No. of episodes: 13

Production
- Executive producer: Ali Abu Khumra
- Running time: 20–30 minutes
- Production company: Etana Productions (2019–present)

Original release
- Network: Al Sharqiya TV
- Release: May 6, 2019

Hawa Baghdad is an Iraqi television show produced by Al Sharqiya.

The show starred Eser West and Zahra Habib, and was written and directed by Muhaned Abu Khumra. It first aired on Al Sharqiya on May 6, 2019.

All of the songs were by the singers Aseel Hamim, Nasrat El-Badr, and Hussein Ghazal.

== Cast ==
- Eser West
- Zahraa Habib
- Sami Qoftan
- A’awatef El-Salman
- Angham El-Rabeey
- Kazem El-Qorashyy
- Saad Khalifa
- Mohamed Nasser

== Production ==
All of the episodes had been shot in Baghdad in April–May 2019.

All of the episodes were shot by ُEl-Badr cultural and art institution crews with the assistance of Turkish videographers.

== Theme song ==
Song Name: Hawa Baghdad

Singers: Nassrat El-Badr

Lyrics: Diaa El-Mayaly

Compositing: Nassrat El-Badr

Music Distribution: Hossam El-Dien

Studios: Nassrat El-Badr Studios

== Songs ==
Episode	Title	Singer	Music	Lyrics	Composer
1	Love is a fictional thing	Hussein El-Ghazal and Aseel Hamim	Nassrat El -Badr	Diaa El-Badr	Hossam El-Dien
2	Tribalism	Hussein El-Ghazal and Aseel Hamim	Nassrat El -Badr	Diaa El-Badr	Hossam El-Dien
3	Black day	Hussein El-Ghazal and Aseel Hamim	Nassrat El -Badr	Diaa El-Badr	Hossam El-Dien
4	Love is luck	Hussein El-Ghazal and Aseel Hamim	Nassrat El -Badr	Diaa El-Badr	Hossam El-Dien
5	Ordinary	Hussein El-Ghazal and Aseel Hamim	Nassrat El -Badr	Diaa El-Badr	Hossam El-Dien
6	Karada	Nasssrat El-Badr and Aseel Hamim	Nassrat El -Badr	Diaa El-Badr	Hossam El-Dien
7	Forbidden yet	Hussein El-Ghazal and Aseel Hamim	Nassrat El -Badr	Diaa El-Badr	Hossam El-Dien
8	Love you	Hussein El-Ghazal and Aseel Hamim	Nassrat El -Badr	Diaa El-Badr	Hossam El-Dien
9	You, You!	Hussein El-Ghazal and Aseel Hamim	Nassrat El -Badr	Diaa El-Badr	Hossam El-Dien
10	Dying missing you	Hussein El-Ghazal and Aseel Hamim	Nassrat El -Badr	Diaa El-Badr	Hossam El-Dien
11	The most beautiful thing	Hussein El-Ghazal and Aseel Hamim	Nassrat El -Badr	Diaa El-Badr	Hossam El-Dien
12	First time singing	Hussein El-Ghazal and Aseel Hamim	Nassrat El -Badr	Diaa El-Badr	Hossam El-Dien
13	It's edited	Hussein El-Ghazal and Aseel Hamim	Nassrat El -Badr	Diaa El-Badr	Hossam El-Dien
14	With you	Hussein El-Ghazal and Aseel Hamim	Nassrat El -Badr	Diaa El-Badr	Hossam El-Dien

== Awards and nominations ==
Year	Award	Genre	Nominee	Result	Reference
2019	El-Helal El-zahaby Prize	Best Show	Hawa Baghdad	Won	
2019	El-Helal El-zahaby Prize	Best Script	Hawa Baghdad	Won	
2019	El-Helal El-zahaby Prize	Best Title	Hawa Baghdad	Won	
2019	El-Helal El-zahaby Prize	Best Young Actor	Eser West	Won	
2019	El-Helal El-zahaby Prize	Best Young Actress	Zahraa Habib	Won	
2019	El-Helal El-zahaby Prize	Best Director	Muhaned Abu Khumra	Won	
