= Joker (Slovenian magazine) =

Slovenian monthly magazine

Joker

Joker was a Slovenian monthly magazine based in Ljubljana. Started as a computer gaming magazine, it has expanded into reviewing books, movies, educational articles of a general nature and much more. Known for having an interesting writing style which also includes archaic and neologistic Slovene words.

== History ==
Joker was founded in May 1992 under the wing of Moj mikro. The first edition was duotone and because of poor sales it was cancelled. In September 1993 it was revived as a half-sized addition to Moj Mikro. In January 1994 it had grown into an independent magazine of full size format. A compact disc was added in December 1995 and a website was launched in March 1996. In December 2000 Joker became the first Slovenian magazine and one of the first in the world to include a DVD with every copy. From 2015 Joker had a digital edition for iOS and Android.

It also had a website with an archive containing much of the content from the magazine and one of the largest Slovenian online message boards called mn3njalnik. Gnojišče is a sub forum on this board and is the Slovenian equivalent of /b/. The magazine was closed in 2017.

== See also ==
- List of magazines in Slovenia
