= Edvard Ravnikar =

Slovenian architect

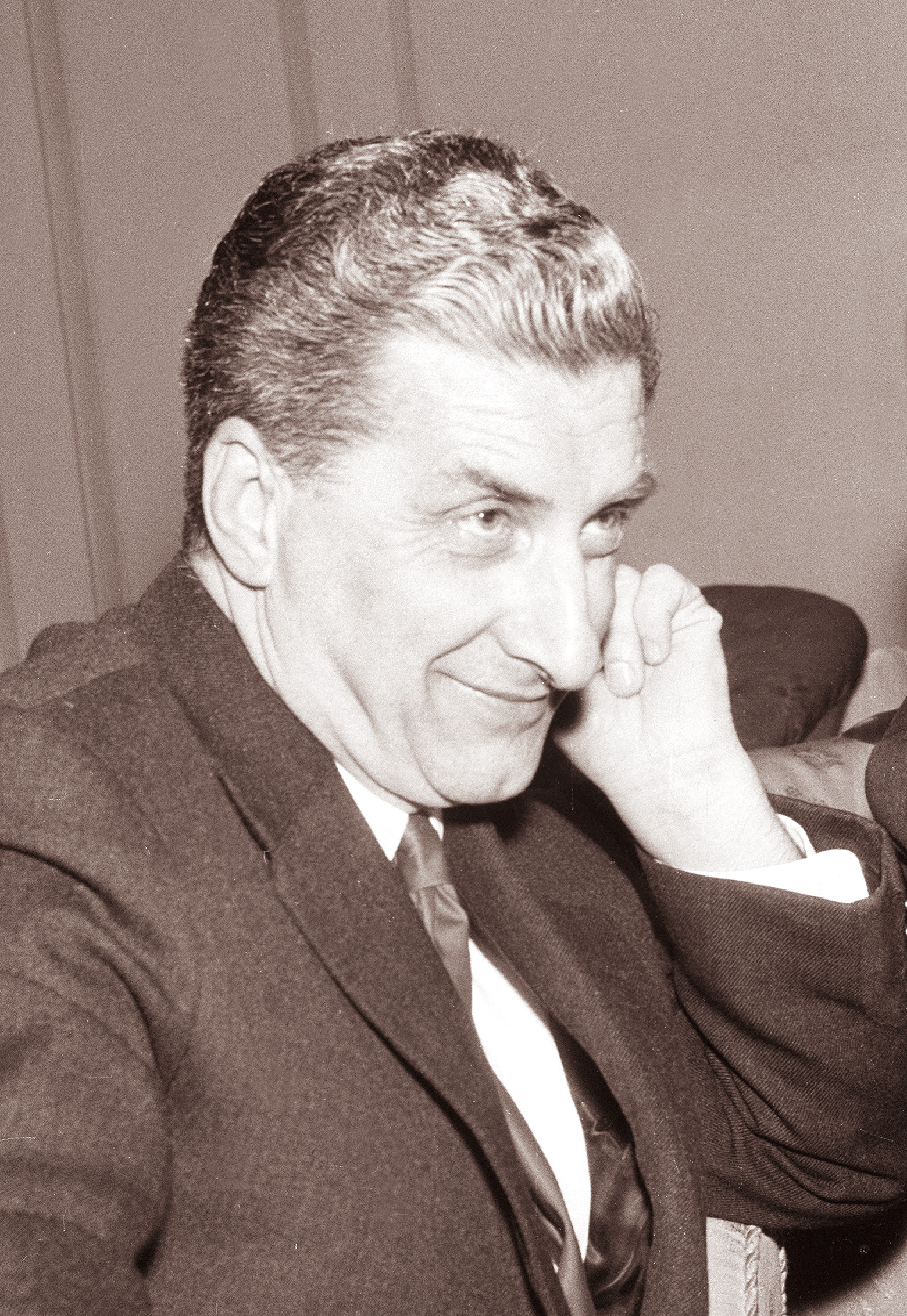
- Born: December 4, 1907; Novo Mesto, Slovenia (Austria-Hungary)
- Died: August 23, 1993 (aged 85); Ljubljana, Slovenia
- Education: Faculty of Technical Sciences in Ljubljana, Technical University of Vienna
- Occupations: Architect; Architectural theorist Urban designer Designer; University Professor; Author
- Spouse(s): Silva Ravnikar, born Prevec (1938–1993)
- Children: 3
- Awards: Prešeren Award (1961, 1978); Plečnik Award (1974, 1987); Herder Prize (1988)
- Practice: Yugoslav Ministry of Construction; Sodobna Stanovanjska Oprema; Institute for construction of Revolution Square); Faculty of Architecture Ljubljana; Ambient d.o.o., Ljubljana
- Projects: Modern gallery Ljubljana; Burial ground, Rab, Croatia; Burial ground, Begunje; Council assembly building, Kranj; National Bank building, Celje; National Bank building, Kranj; Faculty of Civil Engineering; Hotel Creina, Kranj; Hotel Maestral, St. Stefan; Babylon Rotana Baghdad Hotel, Baghdad, Iraq; The Republic Square, Ljubljana; The residential complex Ferant Garden; Department store Globus, Kranj; Cultural centre Cankarjev dom National Gallery extension, Ljubljana; Reconstruction of Skopje 1963
- Design: Modern Kitchen Concept; The Articulum Furniture; Covers of Arhitekt Magazine

Edvard Ravnikar (4 December 1907 – 23 August 1993) was a Slovenian architect.

Ravnikar was born in Novo Mesto and was a student of architect Jože Plečnik. Later, he led the new generation of Slovene architects, notable for developing the Slovene architecture field's infrastructure, organizing architectural competitions etc. He was a professor at the Ljubljana School of Architecture. He also promoted Scandinavian architectural style in Slovenia, particularly Finnish achievements in architecture accomplished by those such as Alvar Aalto. His most notable creations feature prominently in Ljubljana, among them Republic Square, Cankar Hall, Maximarket department store, and the Museum of Modern Art. For his work, he received the Prešeren Award in 1961 and in 1978. He died in Ljubljana, aged 85.

== Complete list of projects ==
=== Built ===
Memorials and memorial grounds

- Ossuary for the Fallen during World War I, Žale Cemetery, Ljubljana, Slovenia, 1937
- Battelino Family Tomb, Žale Cemetery, Ljubljana, designed 1938, built 1938
- Two monuments to the women's demonstrations during the WW II, Ljubljana, Slovenia, designed 1951
- Hostages' burial ground Begunje, Slovenia, designed 1952, unveiled 1953
- Hostages' burial ground Draga, Slovenia, designed 1952, unveiled 1953
- Internees' burial ground Rab Island, Croatia, designed 1953, unveiled 1953
- Monument to the Fallen during WWII, Kovor - Tržič, Slovenija, unveiled 1953
- Monument to the Fallen during WWII, Nova vas - Bloke, Slovenija 1955
- Monument to the Fallen during WWII, Rečica ob Savinji, Slovenija, unveiled 1956
- Monument to the Fallen during WWII, Ig, Slovenija, unveiled 1958
- Two monuments to the National and Liberation war, Pivka, Slovenia, designed and unveiled 1958

Galleries and cultural centers

- Museum of Modern Art (Moderna galerija), Ljubljana, Slovenia, designed 1939, built 1940–1951
- Jakopičevo likovno razstavišče, Ljubljana, Slovenija, built 1973
- National Gallery Extension, Puharjeva Street, Ljubljana, Slovenia, designed 1989, built 1992–1993
- Cankarjev Dom Cultural and Congress Centre, Ljubljana, designed 1977, built 1982–1983

Residential buildings

- Atelier and House of Vida Pengov, Ljubljana, Slovenia, designed 1940–1941, built with substantial changes 1948
- Bokalce Retirement Home, Ljubljana, Slovenia, designed 1938, 1940, built with significant changes
- Villa Vidmar Ljubljana-Ježica, Slovenia, designed 1941, built 1943–1945
- Šiška apartment building, Ljubljana, study 1947, partly built
- Six housing blocks, Nova Gorica, Slovenia, designed 1947, built 1948
- University student housing Ljubljana, designed 1957, built 1959
- Apartment building on Štefanova Street, Ljubljana, Slovenia, designed 1958, built 1960
- Two high-rise apartment buildings on Hrvatski Square, Ljubljana, Slovenia, designed 1958, built 1967
- Two high-rise apartment buildings on Pražakova Street, Ljubljana, Slovenia, designed 1963, built 1963
- Housing complex, Ferant's Garden/Ferantov Vrt, Ljubljana, competition entry 1964, 1st Prize, built 1967–1973

Administrative and faculty buildings

- Council Assembly building, Kranj, Slovenia, limited competition 1954, designed 1955, built 1959
- National Bank, Celje, Slovenia, designed 1959, built 1959
- Ljudska Pravica publishing house and printing house, Ljubljana, Kopitarjeva Street, designed 1957, built 1961
- Faculty of Civil and Geodetic Engineering, Jamova Street, Ljubljana, designed 1960, built 1963–1966
- Institute for Low and High Current Electronics, Ljubljana, designed 1946–1947, built 1950–1954
- Slovenian Forestry Institute, Ljubljana, Slovenia, designed 1947 and built 1948
- Faculty of Arts and Natural Sciences, Skopje, Macedonia, designed 1947, partly built 1948–1949
- Student campus Ljubljana, Slovenia, designed 1948, built 1950–1957
- Urban Planning Institute, Kranj, Slovenia, designed 1955, partly built
- National Bank of Slovenia, Kranj, Slovenia, Designed 1959 / built 1959
- Health Centre, Rudnik, Ljubljana, designed 1959, built 1960
- Annex to the Joze Plecnik Gymnasium secondary school Ljubljana, Šubičeva Street, Ljubljana, designed 1970, built 1971

Hotels, recreational and commercial buildings

- Hotel and Cultural Centre for the Carinthia region, Slovenia, designed 1958, built 1960–1961
- Kranjska Gora Motel, Slovenia, designed 1960, built 1961
- Maestral Hotel, Pržno, Montenegro, designed 1964, c built 1970–1971
- Petrol gas station Ljubljana, Slovenia, designed 1968, built 1968–1969
- Creina Hotel Kranj, Slovenia, designed 1968, built 1969–1970
- Medno Motel bedroom wing, Medno, Slovenia, designed 1969, built 1970
- Babylon Oberoy Hotel, Baghdad, Iraq, from 1974 onwards, built 1983–1984
- Globus department store, Kranj, Slovenia, designed 1970, built 1972–1973
- Maximarket department store building, Ljubljana, Slovenia, designed 1960, built 1972–1973
- Ljubljanska banka Tower, Ljubljana, Slovenia, designed 1960, built 1972–1973
- Annex to Ljubljanska banka, Ljubljana, Slovenia, designed 1960, built 1972–1973
- Iskra Tower, city quarter, Ljubljana, Slovenia, designed 1960, built 1972–1973
- Design layout for Revolution Square (now Republic Square), Ljubljana, Slovenia including garages and passage to commercial outlets, Maximarket building, Ljubljanska banka Tower, Iskra Tower, Annex to Ljubljanska banka, designed1960, built 1961–1974

=== Urbanism ===
- Urban planning of Ljubljana, designed 1945–1946
- Revitalization designs for south Slovenia region (Žužemberk, Kočevje and Ribnica), designed 1946
- Urban planning of Nova Gorica, Slovenia, designed 1948–1950, partially implemented
- Regional planning for the free area of Trieste from Ankaran to Novigrad, designed 1948–1949
- Single–family homes in Dravlje and Stožice, Ljubljana, Slovenia, designed 1952, a study
- Study of urban development options for Ljubljana, designed 1953, partly built
- Regional planning for the Piran peninsula, designed 1956, partly built
- Master Plan for Skopje, reconstruction plan following earthquake 1963
- Layout for the Kamnik-Bakovnik Settlement, Slovenia, designed 1968, built 1969–1970
- Ideal neighbourhood for 5000 people, Ljubljana, Slovenia, designed 1958, a study
- Extension of the town of Ljutomer, Slovenia, designed 1950, a study
- Housing settlement Kidričevo, Slovenia, designed 1950, a study
- Regional planning for Bled, Slovenia, designed 1965–1967

=== Design ===
Product design

- Articulum prefabricated furniture, designed 1952, prototypes made 1952 though never serially manufactured
- Prefabricated single-family house, designed 1952
- Timber summerhouses Fijesa, Istria, designed 1955
- Kitchen, designed 1955, prototype 1956

Graphic design

- Liberation front simbol (Triglav OF), 1941
- Vignettes in Delo newspaper, Slovenia, May, November 1942
- Drawings for the Bonds of Freedom Fund for 1000 and 5000 lire, 1942
- Front page and drawings from "Do it yourself in concrete» brochure 1945
- Slovene National Liberation Council coat-of-arms, designed and executed 1946

Cover designs

- Architect magazine, from 1951 on
- Fontamara: Ignacio Silkone, Cankarjeva založba, 1951
- Vnuki: Luis Adamič, Cankarjeva založba, 1951
- Architecture of Yugoslavia catalogue, 1951

Other

- Honorary chains for the mayor of Ljubljana, designed 1939

Exhibition design

- EXHIBITION SYSTEM I: Exhibition of Swiss Posters Ljubljana, Slovenia, designed and set up in 1953
- EXHIBITION SYSTEM II: Exhibition of Atomic Physics Ljubljana, designed and set up in 1953
- Fifth Anniversary of the Liberation Front exhibition, Narodni dom, Ljubljana, Slovenia, designed and set up in 1946
- Architectural visions Exhibition, Graz, Austria, designed and set up in 1984

=== Awarded architectural competition entries ===
1934–1949

- Ossuary for the Fallen during World War I, Žale Cemetery, Ljubljana, Slovenia, 1937, 1st Prize
- Cultural Centre Trbovlje, Slovenia, 1938, 1st Prize
- Bokalce Home for the Elderly Ljubljana, Slovenia, 1938, 1st Prize
- Swimming pool Kolezija Ljubljana, Slovenia, 1939, 2nd Prize
- Planning of the Medlog neighborhood, Celje, Slovenia, 1939–1940, 1st Prize 1940

1940–1949

- Hospital Jesenice, Slovenia, 1st Prize
- Urban planning for the city of Ljubljana, 1941, purchase of rights
- New Belgrade with the palace of the central committee of the Communist party of Yugoslavia, Serbia, 1946, first 2nd Prize as 1st Prize was not awarded
- Palace of the Presidency of the Government of the Federal and People's Republic of Yugoslavia, New Belgrade, Serbia, 1947, 3rd Prize
- Representational hotel, New Belgrade, Serbia, 1947, 2nd Prize
- Apartment buildings, New Belgrade, Serbia, 1947, 2nd Prize
- Central post office Ljubljana, Slovenia, 1947, shared 1st and 2nd Prize
- Palace of the People's Assembly of Slovenia, Ljubljana, The Nuns' Garden, 1947, 1st Prize
- The People's Assembly of Slovenia, Tivoli, Ljubljana, 1947–1948, 2nd Prize ex aequo as the 1st Prize was not awarded
- Museum of Modern Art and National Gallery New Belgrade, Serbia, 1948, 1st Prize

1950–1959

- Design for the island of Ruissalo, Turku, Finland, International competition, 1953, 3rd Prize
- Extension of the "Nama" department store Ljubljana, 1953, 1st Prize
- Canteen for the student campus, University of Ljubljana, Slovenia, 1954, purchase of rights
- High-rise apartment building Ljubljana, Slovenia, 1956, purchase of rights ex aequo outside competition
- Apartment building Ljubljana, Slovenia, 1956, 2nd Prize outside competition
- Layout for the centre of Ljubljana, Slovenia, 1957, purchase of rights outside competition

1960–1969

- Layout for Revolution square (now Republic Square), Ljubljana, with garages and passage to commercial outlets, Maximarket building, Ljubljanska banka Tower, Iskra Tower, Annex to Ljubljanska banka, 1960, 1st Prize
- Office building, Congress Square Ljubljana, 1960, 2nd Prize
- Office building, Ljubljana, Slovenia, 1962, 1st Prize ex aequo
- Layout for Ajdovščina square in the center of Ljubljana, Slovenia, 1963, 1st Prize
- Tourist complex, Budva St. Stephan, Montenegro, 1964 1st Prize
- Urban design for the Bežigrad area around the Plecnik sports stadium Ljubljana, Slovenia, 1964, 1st Prize
- Ferant's Garden Housing Complex, Ljubljana, 1964, 1st Prize,
- Design for Tronchetto Island, Venice, Italy, international competition, 1964, 1st Prize ex aequo, production drawings 1965–1967
- Hotel "Maestral" Pržno, Montenegro, 1965, 1st Prize
- Faculty for Mechanical Engineering, Priština, Kosovo, 1965, 1st Prize
- Building for the Central committee of the Communist Party of Macedonia, Skopje, Macedonia, 1966, 1st Prize
- Serbian National Theatre, Novi Sad, 1966, 1st Prize
- Town hall Skopje, Macedonia, 1966, 1st Prize
- Urban design of a small area of Zagreb, 1966, purchase of rights
- Slovenian Radio and Television building, Ljubljana, 1967, purchase of rights
- Town Hall Amsterdam, Holland, 1967, honourable mention
- City centre Espoo, Finland, international competition, 1967, honourable mention
- Avala Hotel, Budva, Montenegro, 1968, 1st Prize
- Ruski Car (Russian Tsar) neighbourhood Bežigrad, Ljubljana, Slovenia, 1968, 1st prize
- Competition for the Ljubljana Castle Reconstruction, Ljubljana, Slovenia, 1969, 1st purchase of rights
- Neighbourhood adjacent to the Plecnik Sports Stadium Bežigrad, Ljubljana, Slovenia, 1969, 1st Prize

1970–1979

- Park Hotel and the Bled town centre, 1971, 2nd Prize
- Opera Belgrade, Serbia, 1971, 2nd Prize
- Hotel Petrovac na moru, Montenegro, 1971, 2nd Prize
- University of Priština, Kosovo, 1972, 1st Prize

1980–1993

- Centre for Social Organisations, Ljubljana, Slovenia, 1980, special prize outside the competition
- Design Components for the urban design of Ljubljana, 1985, purchase of rights
- South Bežigrad area, Ljubljana, Slovenia, 1986, purchase of rights
- National and University Library II, Ljubljana, Slovenia, 1989, honourable mention
- National Gallery, Puharjeva Street, Ljubljana, Slovenia, 1989, 1st Prize

=== Commissioned projects ===
Buildings

- Zdenka Reja's tombstone, Žale Cemetery, Ljubljana, designed 1930, built 1930
- Battelino family tomb, Žale Cemetery, Ljubljana, designed 1938, built 1938
- Museum of Modern Art, Ljubljana, Slovenia, designed 1939, built 1940–1951
- Atelier and House of Vida Pengov, Ljubljana, Slovenia, designed 1940–1941, built with substantial changes 1948
- Villa Hribar, Ljubljana, Slovenia, designed 1940
- Villa Vidmar, Ljubljana, designed 1941, built 1943–1945
- The standard designs for rural elementary schools, shelters and community centers, a study, 1945
- Museum of the National and Liberation War, Ljubljana, Slovenia, 1946, a study
- Institute for Low and High Current Electronics, Ljubljana, designed 1946–1947, built 1950–1954
- Šiška housing, Ljubljana, Slovenia, study 1947, partly constructed
- Ljubljana housing Sveti Križ, Ljubljana, Slovenia, designed 1947
- Faculty of Philosophy and natural sciences, Skopje, Macedonia, designed 1947, constructed 1948–1949
- Slovenian Forestry Institute, Ljubljana, Slovenia, designed 1947, constructed 1948
- 6 apartment buildings, Nova Gorica, Slovenia, designed 1947, constructed 1948
- Student campus, Ljubljana, Slovenia, designed 1948, constructed 1950–1957
- Extension of the town of Ljutomer, Slovenia, designed 1950
- Printing house Ljubljana, Ljubljana, Slovenia, designed 1950
- Extension of the town of Lendava, Slovenia, designed 1950
- District People's Committee building, Nova Gorica, Slovenia, designed 1950
- Two monuments to the women's demonstrations during the war, Ljubljana, Slovenia, designed 1951, executed 1951
- Monument to the National and Liberation War, Bloke, Slovenia, designed 1950, built 1951–1952
- Two single-family homes in Dravlje and Stožice, Ljubljana, designed 1952
- Housing complex, Maglaj, Bosna, designed 1952
- Hostages' burial ground, Begunje, Slovenia, designed 1952, built 1952–1953
- Hostages' burial ground, Draga, Slovenia, designed 1952, built 1952–1953
- Partisans' burial ground, Pokljuka, Slovenia, designed 1953
- Internees' burial ground, Rab Island, Croatia, designed 1953, built 1953
- Hotel and Cultural Centre for the Carinthia region, Slovenia, designed 1958, built 1960–1961
- High-rise apartment building, Štefanova Street, Ljubljana, Slovenia, designed 1958, built 1960
- Two high-rise apartment buildings, Hrvatski square, Ljubljana, Slovenia, designed 1958, constructed 1967
- "Ljudska pravica" publishing house and printing house, Kopitarjeva Street, Ljubljana, designed 1957, built 1958–1961
- Trubar second-hand bookshop, Mestni trg, Ljubljana, Slovenia, designed and built 1959
- National Bank, Kranj, Slovenia, designed 1959, built 1959
- Health Centre Rudnik, Ljubljana, Slovenia, designed 1959, built 1960
- Slovenijales office building, Miklošičeva Street, Ljubljana, Slovenia, built 1959
- Two monuments to the National and Liberation war, Zgornji St. Peter, Pivka, Slovenia, designed and built 1958
- Faculty of Civil and Geodetic Engineering, Jamova Street, Ljubljana, designed 1960, built 1963–1966
- Motel Kranjska gora, designed 1960, built 1961
- Executive council of Slovenia, Ljubljana, designed 1960
- Monument to the national and liberation war, Jesenice, designed and built 1960
- Standard design for a house, Bohinj, designed 1960
- Two housing towers Pražakova Street, Ljubljana, Slovenia, designed 1963, built 1963
- Office building Igriška Street, Ljubljana, Slovenia, designed 1964, built 197?
- Hotel Miločer St. Stephan, Montenegro, designed 1966–1981
- Petrol station Ljubljana, Slovenia, designed 1968, built 1968–1969
- Hotel Creina Kranj, Slovenia, designed 1968, built 1969–1970
- Motel Medno bedrooms' wing, Medno, Slovenia, designed 1969, built 1970
- Globus department store, Kranj, Slovenia, designed 1970, built 1972–1973
- Annex to the gymnasium secondary school Ljubljana, Šubičeva Street, designed 1970, built 1971
- Hotel Avala Budva, Montenegro, designed 1972
- Hotel Babylon Oberoi Baghdad, Iraq, designed from 1974 onwards, built 1983–1984
- Government palace extension Erjavčeva Street, Ljubljana, designed 1975
- Annex to the Slovene academy of arts and sciences Ljubljana, designed 1975
- Cankarjev dom Cultural and Congress Centre, Ljubljana, designed 1977, built 1982–1983
- Extension to Cankarjeva zalozba, Kopitarjeva Street, Ljubljana, Slovenia
- Proposal for the monument (Obelisk) celebrating the end of the war Congress Square, Ljubljana, Slovenia, designed 1984, not
- Vertical extension of the modern gallery Ljubljana, Slovenia, designed 1988–1990
- Design for Prešeren Square Ljubljana, 1988, partially implemented 1988
- National gallery extension Ljubljana, Slovenia, built 1992–1993

Urbanism

- Ljubljana city railway grid, Ljubljana, Slovenia, designed 1940
- Study for the layout of the Fužine neighbourhood, Ljubljana, designed 1942
- Layout proposal for the area in the old town of Ljubljana (Poljanska Street-Krek Square-Streliška Street), Ljubljana, designed 1942
- Urban planning studies for the transformation of villages, designed 1945–1946
- Urban planning design for Ljubljana, designed 1945–1946, project suspended 1947
- Revitalization designs for south Slovenia region (Žužemberk, Kočevje and Ribnica), designed 1946
- Study of layout options for the Nuns' garden Ljubljana, Slovenia, designed 1947
- Regulation of Nova Gorica, Slovenia, designed 1948–1950, partially implemented
- Regional design for the area from Ankaran to Novigrad, Slovenia and Croatia, designed 1948–1949, exhibited in Koper 1950
- Housing settlement Kidričevo, Slovenia, a study 1950
- Regional plan for Bled, designed 1965–1967
- The study of the developmental options of Ljubljana, designed 1953, partly executed
- Regional design for Piran peninsula, designed 1956, partly built
- Ideal neighbourhood for 5,000 people Ljubljana, a study, designed 1958
- National bank, Celje, designed 1959, constructed 1959
- Layout of Kamnik-Bakovnik settlement, near Ljubljana, designed 1968, built 1969–1970
- Ljubljana centre between Aškerčeva Street, VII. korpusa Street, Kidričeva Street and Titova (now Slovenska Street), the study 1986
- Design for Prešeren square, Ljubljana, Slovenia, designed 1988, partially implemented 1988

== Bibliography ==
=== Primary sources ===
ARTICLES BY EDVARD RAVNIKAR

Edvard Ravnikar remained true to his professional values, although he wrote under many pen names due to the unfavorable political climate. Below is a list of the articles he wrote for newspapers, magazines, and catalogues, as well as lectures, throughout his career. Some are later reprints of Ravnikar's texts.

- Reprint of an interview with Edvard Ravnikar, Oblikovalec Nove Gorice-Il progettista di Nova Gorica (The designer of Nova Gorica), Soča, časopis na meji-Isonzo, giornale di frontiera, Year 19, No. 70/71 (November–December 2006, January 2007), page 15, Slovenian, ISSN 1124-6510
- Edvard Ravnikar, Urbanizem in arhitektura (Urbanism and architecture), Catalogue Seminar Urbanizem 63, Ljubljana, May 1963, pages 1–7, Slovenian
- Edvard Ravnikar, Razmišljanje o Ljubljani (Ljubljana Reflections) 1946, reprint in Urbani izziv, Ljubljana, 1993, No. 23–25, pages 15–18, Slovenian
- Edvard Ravnikar, Valentin in nastanek njegovega sveta (Valentine and the creation of his world) Arhitektov bilten – AB, Ljubljana 1993, No. 117/118, pages 16–21, Slovenian
- Edvard Ravnikar, Maks Fabiani arhitekt, inženir, pedagog (Max Fabiani architect, engineer, educator), Primorski dnevnik, Trieste, 21 June 1988, No.132, page 12, Slovenian
- Edvard Ravnikar, Jože Plečnik, arhitekt 1872–1957 (Jože Plečnik, architect 1872–1957, the article for the exhibition catalogue), reprint: Arhitektov bilten – AB, Ljubljana 1987, No. 87/88, pages 3–6, Exhibition Jože Plečnik, Architecte: 1872–1957, Paris, Centre Georges Pompidou 1986, Slovenian
- Edvard Ravnikar, Območje med Aškerčevo, Cesto 7. korpusa, Kidričevo ulico in Titovo cesto,(Area between Aškerčevo, Cesto 7. korpusa, Kidrfčevo ulico and Titovo cesto) Arhitektov bilten – AB, Ljubljana 1986, No. 85/86, pages 37–38, Slovenian
- Edvard Ravnikar, O razvoju Ljubljane sredi osemdesetih let (On the development of Ljubljana in the mid-nineteen eighties), Arhitektov bilten – AB, Ljubljana 1986, No. 81/82, pages 3–4, Slovenian
- A. Vodopivec, Pogovor z Edvardom Ravnikarjem (Interview with Edvard Ravnikar), Nova revija, Ljubljana 1985, No. 35/36, pages 292–304, Slovenian
- Edo Ravnikar, Iz natečaja 1976 za ljubljanski krematorij (From the 1976 Competition for the Crematorium in Ljubljana), Arhitektov bilten – AB, Ljubljana 1984–85, No. 73/74, page. 42, Slovenian
- Edvard Ravnikar, Kratek oris modernega urbanizma v Sloveniji - referat na 1. posvetovanju arhitektov v Dubrovniku 23.–25. November 1950 (A Brief Outline of Modern Urbanism in Slovenia (paper at the 1st Consultation of Architects in Dubrovnik, 23–25 November 1950)), Arhitektov bilten – AB, Ljubljana 1982, No. 60/61, pages 4–6, Slovenian
- E. R. (Edvard Ravnikar), Študij formske izraznosti pri seminarskem delu (Study of form expressiveness), Arhitektov bilten – AB, Ljubljana 1982, No. 60/61, pages 46–48, Slovenian
- Edvard Ravnikar, Vitalnost Plečnikovega neoklasicizma, (The vitality of Plečnik's neoclassicism), Arhitektov bilten – AB, Ljubljana 1982, No. 62/63, pages 3–7, Slovenian
- E. R.(Edvard Ravnikar, O arhitektu (About the architect) Arhitektov bilten – AB, Ljubljana 1982, No. 62/63, pages 50–51, Slovenian
- Edvard Ravnikar, Nova Gorica po 35 letih (Nova Gorica after 35 years) Arhitektov bilten – AB, Ljubljana 1984, No. 68/69, pages 43–46, Slovenian
- Edo Ravnikar, Urbanistična misel v Sloveniji od leta 1900 (Urban thinking in Slovenia since 1900), Kronika 1, Ljubljana 1981, No. 02, pages 166–183, Slovenian
- E. Ravnikar, Razgovor: Današnji arhitektov položaj v Sloveniji (Interview: Today's position of the architect in Slovenia), Arhitektov bilten – AB Ljubljana 1981, No. 54/55, pages 4–7, Slovenian
- I. Mladenovič – intervju Edo Ravnikar, Ima neka fiksna tačka (Interview Edvard Ravnikar, (There is a constante point), OKO Zagreb, 12–26 June 1980, pages 5–6, Croatian
- E. Ravnikar, Ljubljana 2000 (Ljubljana 2000), Arhitektov bilten – AB, Ljubljana 1979, No. 44/45, pages 3–7, Slovenian
- E. R. (Edvard Ravnikar), In memoriam Juraj Neidhardt (In memoriam to Juraj Neidhardt), Arhitektov bilten – AB, Ljubljana 1979, No. 44/45, s pages 9–10, Slovenian
- E. R. (Edvard Ravnikar), Ali mora ta hiša biti ravno taka? (Does this house have to be this way?), Arhitektov bilten – AB, Ljubljana 1978, No. 36/37, pages 4–5, Slovenian
- E. R. (Edvard Ravnikar), Novi Mrak na Rimski cesti (Refurbishment of Mrak Inn at Rimska cesta), Arhitektov bilten – AB, Ljubljana 1977, No. 35, pages 5–6, Slovenian
- E. R. (Edvard Ravnikar), Arhitekturna kritika in arhitektura, (Architectural criticism and architecture) Arhitektov bilten – AB, Ljubljana 1977, No. 33, pages 4–6, Slovenian
- R) (Edvard Ravnikar), Razmišljanje ob Omahnovi knjigi, (Reflections on Omahen's book) Arhitektov bilten – AB, Ljubljana 1976, No. 30/31, pages 5–10, Slovenian
- E. Ravnikar, PEA – o arhitekturi in permanentni edukacijii (On architecture and continuing education), Arhitektov bilten – AB, Ljubljana 1975, No. 23, pages 8–9, Slovenian
- Edvard Ravnikar, Ljubo Bavcon, Dve možnosti za prostorski razvoj Univerze v Ljubljani (Two possibilities for the spatial development of the University of Ljubljana), Naši razgledi, Ljubljana, 22 March 1974, No. 6, page 145, Slovenian
- Edo Ravnikar, Trg revolucije (Revolution Square), Ljubljana, Sinteza, Ljubljana 1974, No. 30/32, pages 81–96, Slovenian
- Edo Ravnikar, Ocena AB razpisa – izid AB razpisa (Evaluation of the AB Call – Outcome of the AB Call), Arhitektov bilten – AB, Ljubljana 1973, No. 12, page 43, Slovenian
- Ravnikar, Predlog uspešne stvaritve v našem prostoru: lokal Pejal (Successful architectural proposal in our region: Pejal shop), Arhitektov bilten – AB, Ljubljana 1973, No. 13, page 13, Slovenian
- Edo Ravnikar, Letošnja "Soba 25" kot poskus zelo odprte šole za arhitekturo (This year's "Room 25" an attempt of an open school of architecture), Arhitektov bilten – AB, Ljubljana 1972, No. 5, pages c–d, Slovenian
- Edvard Ravnikar, Obična arhitektura i visoka nauka urbanizma (Ordinary architecture and the high science of urbanism), Arhitektura i urbanizam, Beograd 1971, No. 64–6, pages 86–88, Serbian
- Edo Ravnikar, Hotel Maestral u Pržnom, Budva (Hotel Maestral in Przno in Budva), Covjek i prostor, Zagreb 1971, No 224, pages 8–9, Croatian
- Edo Ravnikar, Bencinski servis "Petrol" (Petrol service station), Sinteza, Ljubljana 1970, No. 17, pages 38–39, Slovenian
- Edo Ravnikar, Stanovanjski objekti na Ferantovem vrtu (Stanovanjski objekti na vrtu Ferantovem), Sinteza, Ljubljana 1970, No. 16, pages 40–45
- Edvard Ravnikar, Pogled na širši prostor okrog Trsta (A wider view on the area around Trieste) (Considerazioni circa lo spazio geografico the circonda Trieste), Most magazine Trieste, 1970, No. 26/27, pages 50–57; (reprint and English translation in Hommage a Edvard Ravnikar, 1907–1993, Ljubljana, Ivaršek, 1995, pages 402–406)
- Edo Ravnikar, V spomin Marka Šlajmerja (In memory of Marko Šlajmer), Večer, Maribor, 29 August 1969, No. 201, page 3
- (Edvard) Ravnikar, Architektur and Freiheit (Arhitektura in svoboda) (Architecture and freedom), TRIGON, Gradec 1969, page 449; (translation v Hommage a Edvard Ravnikar 1907–1993, Ljubljana: lvanšek 1995, page 231), German, Slovenian, English
- Edvard Ravnikar, Ferantov vrt, Arhitektura i urbanizam, Beograd 1969, No. 55, pages 10–11, Slovenian
- Edvard Ravnikar, Internationaler Wettbewerb fur die Planung der Insel Tronchetto in Venedig (Mednarodno tekmovanje za načrtovanje otoka Tronchetto v Benetkah) (International competition for the planning of the island of Tronchetto in Venice), DBZ, Giitersloh 1968, No. 01, pages 19–20, German
- Edvard Ravnikar, Če se ozremo nazaj (Looking back), Sinteza, Ljubljana 1967, No. 07, pages 31–34, Slovenian
- E. R. (Edvard Ravnikar), Ein Touristenzentrum in Jugoslawien (A tourist center in Yugoslavia), Bauwelt Berlin 1966, No. 29, pages 836–839, German
- Edvard Ravnikar, O natečaju za novo središče Skopja (On the competition for the new center of Skopje), Sinteza, 1966, No. 04, pages 5–12, Slovenian
- Edvard Ravnikar, Natečaj za novo središče Skopja – študijske (Skice competition for the new Contest for the new center of Skopje – study sketches), Sinteza, Ljubljana 1966, No. 04, pages 13–16, Slovenian
- Edo Ravnikar, Pred drugim BIO (Second Bienale of Industrial Design), Delo, Ljubljana, 10 June 1966, No 154, page 5, Slovenian
- Edvard Ravnikar, Prizidek prizidka (Extension's extension), Naši razgledi, Ljubljana, 9 July 1966, No 13, page 277, Slovenian
- Edo Ravnikar, Nova faza razvoja ljubljanskega BIO (A new phase of Ljubljana's BIO), Delo, Ljubljana, 13 July 1966, No. 187, page 3 (ponatis Sinteza I, Ljubljana 1966, No. 04, page. 111), Slovenian
- Edvard Ravnikar, Lepše je tudi koristnejše: anketa o industrijskem oblikovanju (Nicer is also more useful: a survey on industrial design), Delo, Ljubljana, 30 July 1966, No 204, Edvard Ravnikar:, page 5, Slovenian
- Edvard Ravnikar, Po 25 letih spet v Praze (Back in Prague after 25 years), Ceskoslovensky architekt, Praga, 12. March 1966, No. 04/05, pages 1–2, Slovenian
- Ravnikar, Edvard, Nova stekla Janje Lap (New works of Janje Lap), Sinteza, revija za likovno kulturo, June 1966, No. 04, pages 62–64, ISSN 0049-0601
- Edo Ravnikar, Obrazloženje idejne koncepcije natjecaja za otok Tronchetto a Veneciji, (Explanation of the concept of the tender for the island of Tronchetto in Venice ) IP, Zagreb 1965, No. 143, pages 1, 4–5
- Edo Ravnikar, Benetke v regionalnem kompleksu reševanja, Sinteza, Ljubljana 1965, No. 2, pages 85, 89–91, Slovenian
- Edvard Ravnikar, Charles Edouard Jeanneret – Le Corbusier; in memoriam, Sinteza, Ljubljana 1965, No 3, pages 63–64, Slovenian
- Edo Ravnikar, Budva (Budva), Sinteza, Ljubljana 1965, No. 03, pages 85–86, Slovenian
- Edvard Ravnikar, Le Corbusier (1887–1965), Naši razgledi XIV, Ljubljana, 11 September 1965, No. 17, pages 354–355
- Edo Ravnikar, Arhitektura, plastika in slikarstvo (Architecture, plastics and painting), Sinteza, Ljubljana 1964, No. 01, pages 2–15, Slovenian
- Edo Ravnikar, Dve podružnici Narodne banke SRS, Kranj in Celje (Two branches of the National Bank of SRS, Kranj and Celje), Sinteza, Ljubljana 1964, No, 01, pages 26–29, Slovenian
- Edo Ravnikar, Marjan Mušič, Arhitektura in čas (Marjan Mušič, Architecture and Time), Urbanizem II, Ljubljana 1964, No. 06, pages 316–317, Slovenian
- Ravnikar Edo, Vzgoja oblikovalcev: zaključna razstava na ljubljanski šoli za oblikovanje 63–64 (Education of designers: the exhibition at the Ljubljana School of Design 63–64), Naši razgledi XIII, Ljubljana, 11 July 1964, No. 13, page 260, Slovenian
- R. E.(Edo Ravnikar), Tronchetto (Tronchetto), Naši razgledi XIII, Ljubljana, 24 Oktober 1964, No. 20, pages 400–401, Slovenian
- Ravnikar Edvard, Naše oblikovanje (Slovenian Design) Delo, Ljubljana, 12 November 1964, No 309, page 1, Slovenian
- E. Ravnikar, Oblikovanje ljubljanskega mestnega središča (Design of the Ljubljana city center), Naši razgledi XII, Ljubljana 28 December 1963, No. 24, pages 490–491, Slovenian
- Edo Ravnikar, Sedem naglavnih grehov naše arhitekture (The seven deadly of our architecture) Sodobnost XI, Ljubljana 1963, No. 10, pages 920–926, Slovenian
- Edo Ravnikar, O vzgoji urbanističnih kadrov (On educating urban planning professionals), Urbanizem, Ljubljana 1963, No. 4/5, pages 14–17, Slovenian
- Ravnikar, Edvard, Delovna metoda in usmeritev, najbistvenejšii vprašanji reforme: (Working method and direction, the most important reform issues ) diskusija o univerzitetnem študiju arhitekture,(discussion about university study of architecture), Naši razgledi XI, Ljubljana, 27 January 1962, No. 2, pages 37–38, Slovenian
- E. Ravnikar, Milan Sever, Naši razgledi XI, Ljubljana, 12.May 1962, No. 9, page 177, Slovenian
- E. Ravnikar, Spomenik revolucije (Monument of the Revolution), Naši razgledi XI, Ljubljana, 23 June 1962, No. 12, pages 230–231, Slovenian
- Edo Ravnikar, Zgradba ČZP "Ljudska pravica" ("Ljudska pravica" Building in Ljubljana), Arhitekt, magazine for architecture, urbanism and product design, 1961, No. 02, pages 20–21 ISSN 1580-5999, Slovenian
- E. Ravnikar, Prešernove nagrade 1961: Klopčič, Skrbinek, Ravnikar, Cvetko (Prešeren Awards 1961) Naši razgledi, Ljubljana, 11.February 1961, No. 03, page 60, Slovenian
- Edo Ravnikar, Oblikovanje s pomočjo števila (Design by number), I. republška razstava otroških likovnih del (I. Republican Exhibition of Children's Fine Arts), Moderna galerija, Ljubljana 1961, page 10, Slovenian
- E. Ravnikar, Ljubljanska šola za arhitekturo (Ljubljana School of Architecture), Naši razgledi X, Ljubljana, 9 September 1961, No.17, page 419, Slovenian
- Edvard Ravnikar, Aktuelna problematika ljubljanske škole za arhitekturu (Current Issues of the Ljubljana School of Architecture) – povodom završene izložbe reformisane prve godine AU, Beograd 1961, No. 11–12, pages 37–39, 62, Serbian
- E. R, (Ravnikar Edvard), Razvoj moderne Ljubljane (The Development of modern Ljubljana) Part 1., Arhitekt, magazine for architecture, urbanism and product design, 1960, No. 1 1960, pages 2–7 ISSN 1580-5999, Slovenian
- Edo Ravnikar, Zgradba Okrajnega ljudskega odbora v Kranju (The building of the Kranj County People's Committee), Arhitekt, Ljubljana 1960, No. 02, pages 17–20 ISSN 1580-5999, Slovenian
- c. r. (Edvard Ravnikar), Urbanisme en Tchecoslovaquia (Urbanism in Czechoslovakia), Arhitekt, Ljubljana 1960, No. 03, page. 21
- es. (Edvard Ravnikar), Hans Bernhard Reichow: Die autogerechte Stadt (The car-friendly city), Arhitekt, Ljubljana 1960, No. 03, page 24
- E. Ravnikar, O reformi študija arhitekture na ljubljanski šoli za arhitekturo (On the reform of the study of architecture at the Ljubljana School of Architecture), Arhitekt, Ljubljana 1960, No. 04, page 25
- Edvard Ravnikar, Nekaj novih pogledov na našo Ljubljano (Some new views on Ljubljana), Arhitekt, Ljubljana 1960, No. 06, page 42
- Edvard Ravnikar, (prispevek k diskusiji) Anketa Naših razgledov o principialnih, osrednjih, perečh vprašanjih našega regionalnega in urbanističnega projektiranja (A survey on pressing issues of regional and urban design), Naši razgledi, Ljubljana, 19 March 1960, No. 06, page 38
- Edvard Ravnikar, Postavitev šentpeterske antike (Setting up the exhibition Šentpeter antike), Naši razgledi IX, Ljubljana, 24 September 1960, No. 18, pages 427–428
- EdvardRavnikar, Kozlerjeva hiša – variantni zazidalni predlog (Kozler House – an alternative building proposal), Arhitekt, Ljubljana 1958, No 23
- E. R.(Edvard Ravnikar), Le Corbusier sedemdesetletnik (Le Corbusier is 70 years old.), Naši razgledi VII, Ljubljana, 11 January 1958, No. 01, page 19–20 in 25, January 1958, No. 02, page 49, Slovenian
- Edvard Ravnikar, Zagovor male ročne skice ob Mušičevih popotnih skicah (Mušič's travel sketches) Arhitekt magazine, 1958, No. 23, pages 30–31, ISSN 1580-5999, Slovenian
- P. R (Edvard Ravnikar), Boris Kobe, Arhitekt, Ljubljana 1957, No 21/22, pages 42–44, Slovenian
- Ravnikar Edvard, Plečnikovo poslanstvo (Plečnik's mission), Ljudska pravica 23, Ljubljana 10 January 1957, No. 08, page 6, Slovenian
- Edvard Ravnikar, Jože Plečnik, Naši razgledi VI, Ljubljana, 12. January 1957, No. 01, page 01, Slovenian
- Edvard Ravnikar, O arhitektu (About the architect), Naša sodobnost V, Ljubljana No. 03, pages 202–205, Slovenian
- Edward Ravnikar, Ob smrti Jožeta Plečnika (In memoriam to Jože Plečnik), RIBA Journal, London 1957, Slovenian
- Ravnikar E., Arhitektov delež pri gradnji kulturnih domov (Architect's share in the construction of cultural homes), Sodobna pota II, Ljubljana 1957. No. 05, pages 282–296, Slovenian
- ER (Edvard Ravnikar), JL (Janez Lajovic) in VM(Vladimir Mušič) Ljubljanski železniški vozel, (Ljubljana Rail Node) Naši razgledi VI, Ljubljana, No. 04, pages 87–88, Slovenian
- Urb. (Edvard Ravnikar), Generalni načrt prometa v mestu Zurcihu (Zurcih City Master Plan) Naši razgledi VI, Ljubljana, 27 April 1957, No. 08, page 185, Slovenian
- r (Edvard Ravnikar) Za novo šolo (For a new school), Naši razgledi VI, Ljubljana, 8 June 1957, No. 11, page 266, Slovenian
- er (Edvard Ravnikar), O študiju arhitekture (About the study of architecture), Naši razgledi VI, Ljubljana, 20. July 1957, No. 14, pages 335–336, Slovenian
- l. r (Edvard Ravnikar): Nekaj misli o Ljubljani in njenem širšem prostoru (Some thoughts on Ljubljana and its wider area), Naši razgledi VI, Ljubljana, 1957, No.18, pages 435–436, Slovenian
- Ravnikar Edvard, Lojze Spacal, Arhitekt magazine, 1956, No. 20, pages 31–33, ISSN 1580-5999, Slovenian
- Ravnikar Edvard, Med generacijami – novoletna razrnišljanja (Between generations – New Year's reflections), Naši razgledi, Ljubljana, 14 January 1956, No. 01, pages 7–10, Slovenian
- A.I. (Edvard Ravnikar), Kipar ČeIo Pertot (Sculptor CeIo Pertot), Naši razgledi V, Ljubljana, 14 January 1956, No. 01, page 20, Slovenian
- D.R. (Edvard Ravnikar), Čelo Pertot, Arhitekt, Ljubljana 1956, No. 18/19, pages 51–53, Slovenian
- Ravnikar Edvard, Odgovor na anketna vprašanja o izgradnji stanovanj (ob natečaju za izgradno stanovanjskih blokov v Ljubljani (Answer to survey questions on housing construction at the competition for the construction of apartment blocks in Ljubljana), Arhitekt, Ljubljana 1956, No. 18–19, page 15, Slovenian
- E. R. (Edvard Ravnikar, Študentska leta v Delftu (Student years in Delft), Arhitekt, Ljubljana 1956, No. 18–19, pages 54–55, Slovenian
- Edvard Ravnikar in Savin Sever, Regionalna zasnova piranskega polotoka, (Regionalna zasnova piranskega polotoka), Arhitekt, Ljubljana 1956, No. 20, pages 10–14, Slovenian
- SS (Edvard Ravnikar), Pogledi na Ljubljanski grad (Views of Ljubljana Castle), Arhitekt, Ljubljana 1956, No. 20, page 30, Slovenian
- P. R. (Edvard Ravnikar): Lojze Spacal, Arhitekt, Ljubljana 1956, No. 20, pages 31–33, Slovenian
- A. P. (Edvard Ravnikar): Bienale 1956, Naši razgledi V, Ljubljana, 10 March 1956, No. 05, pages 128–129, Slovenian
- E. R.: (Edvard Ravnikar) Tri knjige o arhitekturi (Three books on architecture), Naša sodobnost IV, Ljubljana 1956, No. 02, pages 149–152, Slovenian
- Vladimir Murko, Edvard Ravnikar in Dušan Avsec, Profesorji govorijo o ureditvi podiplomskega študija (The professors talk about arranging postgraduate study), Tribuna VI, Ljubljana 1956, page 3, Slovenian
- Edvard Ravnikar: Modern Architecture in Slovenia, Forum, Amsterdam 1956, English
- Ravnikar Edvard, Sever Savin: Regionalna zasnova piranskega polotoka (Regional design of the Piran Peninsula), Arhitekt magazine 1956, No. 20, pages 10–14, ISSN 1580-5999, Slovenian
- Ravnikar E., Ljubljana in bas (Ljubljana and bass), Slovenski izseljenski koledar, Ljubljana 1955, pages 244–252, Slovenian
- ER (Edvard Ravnikar) in MJ (Mitja Jernejec), Organizacija stanovanjske gradnje v Zapadni Evropi (Organization of Housing in Western Europe) Arhitekt, Ljubljana 1955, No. 16, pages 15–17, Slovenian
- Ingre (Edvard Ravnikar), Otroške risbe (Children's drawings), Arhitekt, Ljubljana 1955, No. 16, pages 22–25, Slovenian
- Edvard Ravnikar, Studentsko naselje v Ljubljani (Campus in Ljubljana), Arhitekt, Ljubljana 1955, No. 17, pages 9–10, Slovenian
- E. R.(Edvard Ravnikar), Ceneno pohištvo (Cheap furniture), Arhitekt, Ljubljana 1955, No. 17, pages 26–28, Slovenian
- Edvard Ravnikar, Jugoslawiens anonyme Architektur (Yugoslavia's Anonymous Architecture), Ulmer Monatsheitc, Ulm 1955, Volume 10, page 13, 15, German
- Edvard Ravnikar, Primitiv arkitektur i Jugoslavien – Byg-mastaren (Primitivna arhitektura v Jugoslaviji – Mojster gradbeništva, Primitive architecture in Yugoslavia – The Master of Construction) Stockholm 1955, pages 136–139, Slovenian
- D. R. (Edvard Ravnikar): Henry Moore, Arhitekt, Ljubljana 1955, No. 17, pages 29–31, Slovenian
- Edvard Ravnikar, Interni natečaj za novo poslopje OLO v Kranju, 1. nagrada (Internal competition for OLO building in Kranj, 1st prize), Arhitekt, Ljubljana 1955, No. 17, page 32, Slovenian
- Edvard Ravnikar, Srednja šola preveč poučuje, premalo uči univerzitetni profesorji odgovarjajo na anketo Tribune, (Problems of High school education-university professors' responses to the Tribuna survey) Tribuna V, Ljubljana, 27 December 1955, No. 19–20, page 0, Slovenian
- Edvard Ravnikar and France Ivanšek, Post-war architecture in Yugoslavia, Architects' Year Book, London – Elke 1955, vol 6, pages 121–136, English
- Ravnikar Edvard, Neue Industriebauten (New industrial buildings), published H. and T. Maurer: Otto Meier Verlag, Ravensburg, copyright 1954, Arhitekt magazine 1955, No. 16, page 32, ISSN 1580-5999, German
- Ravnikar Edvard, Študentsko naselje v Ljubljani, (Campus in Ljubljana) Arhitekt magazine No. 17 (1955), pages 9–10, ISSN 1580-5999, Slovenian
- E. R. (Ravnikar Edvard), Regionalna konferenca UIA 1954 (UIA Regional Conference 1954), Arhitekt magazine No. 14, 1954, pages 26–27, ISSN 1580-5999, Slovenian
- Projektant natečajnega "19536" (Edvard Ravnikar): Epilog k natečaju za "Ljubljanski velesejem" (The Epilogue to the Competition for the "Ljubljana Fair"), Arhitekt magazine, Ljubljana 1954, No. 11, pages 23–24, Slovenian
- Meander (Edvard Ravnikar) Stane Kregar, Riko Debenjak, razstava v Moderni galeriji, (Stane Kregar, Riko Debenjak, the exhibition Moderna galerija), Arhitekt magazine, Ljubljana 1954, No. 11, pages 28–29 ISSN 1580-5999, Slovenian
- Ravnikar Edvard, Šolska zgradba v neposrednem, mestnem in regionalnem okolju (School building in the immediate, urban and regional environment), Arhitekt magazine, Ljubljana 1954, No. 12/13, pages 18–27, Slovenian
- Meander (Edvard Ravnikar), Kiparka Vladimira Bratuš (Sculptor Vladimir Bratus), Arhitekt magazine, 1954, No. 14, pages 27–28, ISSN 1580-5999, Slovenian
- Meander (Edvard Ravnikar), Skulptura Miroslava Oražma (Sculpture by Miroslav Oražem), Arhitekt magazine, Ljubljana 1954, No.15, pages 24–25, ISSN 1580-5999, Slovenian
- e. r. (Ravnikar Edvard): Posvetovanje arhitektov FLRJ o stanovanju in Rogaška Slatina (Consultation of FPRY architects on housing and Rogaška Slatina), Arhitekt magazine, No. 15, 1954, pages 31–32, ISSN 1580-5999, Slovenian
- E. R. (Ravnikar Edvard), Za naprednejše gospodinjstvo (For a more advanced household), Sodobno gospodinjstvo magazine, Ljubljana 1954, No. 1/2, pages 3–6, Slovenian
- Edo Ravnikar, Ljubljana čez 50 let (Ljubljana in 50 years), Tedenska tribuna TT, Ljubljana, 4 November 1954, No. 44, page 7, Slovenian
- E. R. (Ravnikar Edvard), Za pravilno obravnavo centra Ljubljane (For proper treatment of the center of Ljubljana), Arhitekt, Ljubljana 1953, No 10, pages 13–14, Slovenian
- E. Ravnikar, Skandinavska pobuda pri reševanju stanovanjskega vprašanja, Naši razgledi, Ljubljana 11 April 1953, No. 7, pages 10–11, Slovenian
- Ravnikar Edvard, Pohorje, pomembno turistično področje, Arhitekt magazine No. 08, April 1953, page 18, ISSN 1580-5999, Slovenian
- Ravnikar Edvard, K regulaciji novega stanovanjskega naselja v Maglaju (The regulation of a new housing estate in Maglaj), Arhitekt magazine No. 6 September/Oktober 1952, pages 14–[17], ISSN 1580-5999, Slovenian
- Ravnikar Edvard, Spomenik NOB na Rabu (Monument to the National Liberation War on Rab), Arhitekt magazine, 1953, No. 10, pages 14–15, ISSN 1580-5999, Slovenian
- RE in TB (Ravnikar Edvard in Tancig Branka), Moderna kuhinja za lažje in boljša gospodinjsko delo (Modern kitchen for easier and better housework), Naša žena, Ljubljana 1953, No. 6, pp. 182–184, Slovenian
- E. Ravnikar, Stanovanjsko vprašanje na Danskem, Švedskem in pri nas (Housing in Denmark, Sweden and here), Tovariš, Ljubljana 15. May 1953, pages 542–550, Slovenian
- Ravnikar Edvard, Naša gradnja stanovanj in njena sodobna problematika (Our housing construction and its contemporary issues), Arhitekt magazine, No. 9, June 1953, page 14, ISSN 1580-5999, Slovenian
- Ravnikar Edvard, Grobišče talcev v Begunjah in Dragi (Hostage cemetery in Begunje and Draga), Arhitekt magazine No. 9, June 1953, page 28, ISSN 1580-5999, Slovenian
- Ravnikar Edvard, "Arhitekt"-ova anketa o spomenikih NOB ("Architect" survey of the National Liberation War monuments), Arhitekt magazine No. 9, June 1953, pages 29–31, ISSN 1580-5999, Slovenian
- Ravnikar Edvard, Za pravilno obravnavo centra Ljubljane (For proper treatment of the center of Ljubljana), 1953, No. 10, pages [13]–14, ISSN 1580-5999, Slovenian
- R. (Ravnikar Edvard), Istaknuti slovenski arhitekt Josip Plečnik (Prominent Slovenian architect Josip Plečnik), Borba, Zagreb, 23 January 1952, Croatian
- Ravnikar Edvard, Razstava arhitekture FLRJ (Exhibition of FLRY architecture), Arhitekt magazine No. 02, January/February 1952, pages 37–38, ISSN 1580-5999, Slovenian
- E. Ravnikar, Anketa o nekaterih aktualnih vprašanjih naše arhitekture – (Survey on issues in architecture-answers to the questioner), Arhitekt, Ljubljana 1952, No. 03, page 26, Slovenian
- Ravnikar Edvard, Jože Plečnik in sodobna slovenska arhitektura (Jože Plečnik and contemporary Slovenian architecture), Arhitekt, magazine for architecture, urbanism and product design, No. 02, January/February 1952, pages 1–[3], ISSN 1580-5999, Slovenian
- Edo Ravnikar, Osamdeset godina Josipa Plečnika (Eighty years of Josip Plečnik), Književne novine, Beograd, 19 January 1952, page 1, Serbian
- Ravnikar Edvard, Razstava švicarskih plakatov Moderna galerija, Ljubljana 16–30 March 1952, Arhitekt magazine No. 4 (May/June 1952), pages 37–39, ISSN 1580-5999, Slovenian
- Ravnikar Edvard, Lapajne Miloš, Šlajmer Marko: Montažna hiša iz lesnih odpadkov, Arhitekt magazine No. 4, May/June 1952, pages 7–[10], [2], ISSN 1580-5999, Slovenian
- Ravnikar Edvard, Naša stanovanjska oprema, Journal Wood, year 3, No. 3 (1952), pages 50–51, ISSN 0024-1067, Slovenian
- Ravnikar Edvard, Študijske prakse na fakultetah za arhitekturo, Arhitekt magazine, No. 01 (Sept. 1951), page 48, ISSN 1580-5999, Slovenian
- Ravnikar Edvard, John Jager – 80-letnik: 1871–1951, Arhitekt magazine No. 1 (September. 1951), pages 41–42, ISSN 1580-5999, Slovenian
- Edo Ravnikar, Spomenik NOB na Blokah (The National Liberation War monument on Blokah), Arhitekt, Ljubljana 1952, No. 04, pages 26–27, Slovenian
- Ravnikar Edvard, Dve koloniji enodružinskih hiš v Ljubljani (Two colonies of single-family houses in Ljubljana), Arhitekt magazine, No. 5 (July/Avg. 1952), pages 15–20, ISSN 1580-5999, Slovenian
- Ravnikar Edvard, Siegfried Giedion: A decade of new architecture, Edition Girsberger, Zürich, 1951, Arhitekt magazine July/August 1952, No. 05, pages 49–50, ISSN 1580-5999, Slovenian
- S. P. (Ravnikar Edvard), Knjižna oprema (Book design), Arhitekt, Ljubljana, March/April 1952, No. 03, page 38–40, ISSN 1580-5999, Slovenian
- E. R. (Ravnikar Edvard), Tehnika v mestu, Arhitekt, magazine, March/April 1952, No. 3, pages 28–29, ISSN 1580-5999, Slovenian
- Ravnikar Edvard, Študijske prakse na fakultetah za arhitekturo (Study practices at the faculties of architecture), Arhitekt magazine, September 1951, No. 1, page 48, ISSN 1580-5999, Slovenian
- E. Ravnikar s sodelavci, Seminar za javne zgradbe in urbanizem: Vloga kolesa v urbanizaciji Slovenije (Seminar for public buildings and urbanism: The role of the bicycle in the urbanization of Slovenia), Arhitekt I, Ljubljana 1951, No 1, pages 35–36, Slovenian
- E. Ravnikar, Arhitektura in zidno slikarstvo pri nas (Architecture and wall painting in our country), Likovni svet, Državna založba Slovenija, Ljubljana 1951, pages 42–59, Slovenian
- Edvard Ravnikar, Ljubljana skozi stoletja, predavanje (Ljubljana through the centuries, lecture), Radio Slovenija 2, Ljubljana 7 May 1951, Slovenian
- Edvard Ravnikar, Preface, uvodnik v katalogu jugoslovanske arhitekture na mednarodni razstavi arhitektur ULA v Rabatu, 1951; Zveza društev arhitektov SFRJ, Rabat 1951, pages 7–8, Slovenian
- E. Ravnikar, Za lepšo Ljubljano (For a more beautiful Ljubljana), Ljudska pravica XII, Ljubljana, 7 January 1951 No. 05, page 4, Slovenian
- Ravnikar Edvard, Lavrenčič Lapajne Milena, Skica urbanizacije Kranja z okolico (Sketch of urbanization of Kranj with its surroundings), Arhitekt magazine, September 1951, No. 1, page 35, ISSN 1580-5999, Slovenian
- prof. arh. Edvard Ravnikar, Anthony Chitty, Arhitekt magazine No. 01, September 1951, pages 52–53, ISSN 1580-5999, Slovenian
- E. Ravnikar, Ljubljanske misli ob novi Spacalovi mapi lesorezov (About Spacal's woodcuts), Ljudska pravica XII, Ljubljana 29. December 1951, No.178, page 13, Slovenian
- E. R. (Ravnikar Edvard), 8. November – dan urbanizma (November 8 – Urbanism Day), Ljudska pravica Ljubljana, 8 November 1950, No. 267, page 2, Slovenian
- E. Ravnikar, Arhitekturi dajmo boljše pogoje (Let's give architecture better conditions), Ljudska pravica XI, Ljubljana, 29 October 1950, No. 258, page 04, Slovenian
- (Edvard Ravnikar): John Jager – graditelj mesta Minneapolis, Slovenski poročevalec XII, Ljubljana 4 April 1950, No. 81, page. 04, Slovenian
- Edvard Ravnikar: Kratek oris modernega urbanizma v Sloveniji (A brief outline of modern urbanism in Slovenia), Problemi arhitekture in urbanizma L.R. Slovenije; Arhitektna sekcija inženirjev in tehnikov LR Slovemje, Ljubljana 1950, pages 5–26, Slovenian
- E. Ravnikar: Južni del centra Ljubljane bo naše univerzitetno mesto (The southern part of the center of Ljubljana will be our university city), Ljudska pravica X, Ljubljana, 10. November 1949, No. 267, page 3, Slovenian
- E. Ravnikar: Ob razstavi arhitekture FLRJ v Moderni galenji (The exhibition of FPRY architecture in Moderna galenja), Novi svet IV, Ljubljana 1949, No 06, pages 604–608, Slovenian
- Ravnikar Edvard, Spremna besedila k projektom, Držvna založba (Slovenije Accompanying texts to projects, Držvna založba Slovenije) Zbornik oddelka za arhitekturo na Univerzi v Ljubljani 1946–1947 (ed. M. Mušič & F. Ivanšek), Ljubljana 1948
- E. Ravnikar, Razstava sovjetske arhitekture v Ljubljani (Exhibition of Soviet Architecture in Ljubljana), Novi svet III, Ljubljana 1948, No. 07/08, pages 612–615, Slovenian
- E. Ravnikar, Nova državna opera v Beogradu (New State Opera in Belgrade), Novi svet III, Ljubljana 1948, No. 04, pages 304–307, Slovenian
- -r. (Edvard Ravnikar), Arhitekt Jože Plečnik 76-letnik (Architect Jože Plečnik at 76), Slovenski poročevalec, January 1948, year 9, No. 20/24, page 3, Slovenian, ISSN 1318-4946
- e. r. (Edvard Ravnikar), Prostor za Zadružni dom, Slovenski poročvalec IX, Ljubljana, 18 January 1948, No. 15, page. 3, Slovenian
- E. Ravnikar, "Veliki Beograd" ("Greater Belgrade"), Obzornik II, Ljubljana, 1947, No. 11/12, pages 451–456, Slovenian
- Edvard Ravnikar, Preteklost in bodočnost Ljubljane (Ljubljana's past and future), Novi svet II, Ljubljana, 1947, No. 03/04, pages 277–287, Slovenian
- Edvard Ravnikar, Maršal Tito našim arhitektom (Marshal Tito to our architects), Novi svet II, Ljubljana, 1947, No. 05/06, pages 362–365,
- Edo Ravnikar (LD), Regulacija vasi v Loški dolini – primer, kako je treba pristopiti iz celotne zasnove k regulaciji posameznega kraja (Regulation of villages in the Loka Valley), Arhitektura, Zagreb 1947, No. 01/02, pages 19–21; also in Urbanizem, arhitektura, konstrukcije, Projektivni zavod LRS, Ministrstva za gradnje, 1948, Slovenian
- Edvard Ravnikar, Možnosti gospodarskega razvoja naše vasi (Opportunities for economic development of our villages), Urbanizem, arhitektura, konstrukcije, Projektivni zavod LRS, Ministrstva za gradnje, 1948, Slovenian
- Edo Ravnikar, Provizoriji in bodočnost naselij (The future of settlements), Koledar OF, Trieste, pages 171–173, 1946, Slovenian

=== Secondary sources ===
ARTICLES ABOUT EDVARD RAVNIKAR

- Neža Mrevlje, Ljubljanska bencinska črpalka iz časov, ko so jih načrtovali najboljši arhitekti (Ljubljana petrol station from times when they were designed by the best architects), 7 June 2019, SiolNET.
- Nika Grabar: Nove Benetke: natečaj za območje Tronchetto in temporalnost arhitekture (New Venice: the Tronchetto Area Competition and Temporality of Architecture) ANNALES Anali za istrske in mediteranske študije (Annales review for Istrian and Mediterranean Studies)

Koper 2018, ISSN 1408-5348 (Print) ISSN 2591-1775 (Online)

- Ravnikarju v spomin (In memory of Edvard Ravnikar) 19 December 2017
- Franci Koncilija, 110-letnica rojstva Edvarda Ravnikarja (110th anniversary of the birth of Edvard Ravnikar) (1907– 1993), 01 December 2017
- Urša Marn, Psi lajajo karavana gre dalje (The dogs bark but the caravan moves on) Prenova notranjosti Cankarjevega doma (Renovation of the interior of Cankarjev dom), Mladina 22 July 2011, No. 29, Slovenian, ISSN 0350-9346
- Balantič Polona, Eden zadnjih univerzalnih arhitektov pri nas (One of the last universal architects in Slovenia), 23 June 2008, Slovenian
- Metka Dolenc, Slovenian design Education and Edvard Ravnikara "B Program", Archives d'Histoire de art, Zbornik za umetnostno zgodovino) (Art History Journal) No. 43, 2007, Slovensko umetnostnozgodovinsko društvo, Ljubljana, c/o Filozofska fakulteta Univerze v Ljubljani, ISSN 0351-224X
- Ostan Aleksander S., Hrausky Andrej Zgodovina in aktualnost projektov o poglabljanju železnice v Ljubljani: Petdeseta leta (History and status of projects for putting the railway below ground level in Ljubljana: 1950s), Arhitektov bilten AB – mednarodna revija za teorijo arhitekture, November 2007, Year 37, št. 173/174, pages 20–23, Slovenian, ISSN 0352-1982
- Ostan Aleksander S., Hrausky Andrej Zgodovina in aktualnost projektov o poglabljanju železnice v Ljubljani; Štirideseta leta (History and status of projects for putting the railway below ground level in Ljubljana: 1940s), Arhitektov bilten AB – mednarodna revija za teorijo arhitekture, November 2007, Year 37, No. 173/174, pages 16–18, Slovenian, ISSN 0352-1982
- Vodopivec Aleš, Aktualnost tradicije (What is the status of tradition) – dvoranska zgradba Mestne občine Kranj (the Kranj town hall), Oris – časopis za arhitekturu i kulturu, 2005 Year 7, No. 36, pages 114–123, Slovenian, English, ISSN 1331-7571
- Koselj Nataša, Tradicija napredka (The tradition of progress) Arhitektov bilten AB – mednarodna revija za teorijo arhitekture 2004, Year 34 No.165/166, pages 2–7 Slovenian, ISSN 0352-1982
- Žnidaršič Rok, Metoda projektiranja arhitekta Edvarda Ravnikarja-arhitektovi postopki prilagajanja spremenljivim pogojem načrtovanja (Design Method by Architect Edward Ravnikar – An Architect's Procedures for Adapting to Variable Planning Conditions), Arhitektov bilten AB – mednarodna revija za teorijo arhitekture, 2004, Year 34, No. 165/166, pages 8–33, Slovenian, ISSN 0352-1982
- Kobe Jurij, Edvard Ravnikar in soba 25 na šoli za arhitekturo (Edvard Ravnikar and Room 25 at the School of Architecture), Arhitektov bilten AB – mednarodna revija za teorijo arhitekture – 2004, Year 34, No.165/166, pages 34–37, Slovenian, ISSN 0352-1982
- Brate Tomaž, Edvard Ravnikar, Art.si – trimesečnik o likovni umetnosti, arhitekturi, oblikovanju in fotografiji, June 2003, pages 47–[52], Slovenian, ISSN 1581-5218
- Ravnikar Edvard, Vuga Boštjan, "Mogoče ste za to premladi —" (You might be too young to understand...) Razgledi, Delo, 1993, Slovenian, ISSN 1318-0401, COBISS.SI-ID – 13201925, COBISS.SI-ID – 78529024
- Vladimir Mušič, Edvard Ravnkar 1907–1993, Journal: Urbani izziv, 1993, No: 23–25, pages 3–14, Slovenian, https://urbaniizziv.uirs.si/Portals/urbaniizziv/Clanki/1993/urbani-izziv-en-1993-23-25-001.pdf
- Kulturni center Ivana Cankarja (Ivan Cankar Cultural Center), publisher: iniciatvni odbor za izgradnjo Kulturnega centra Ivana Cankarja, 1977, Slovenian
- Cedilnik Alenka; Komac Urša, Ocvirk Marjan, Delo arhitekta Edvarda Ravnikarja v Ljubljani (The work of architect Edward Ravnikar in Ljubljana), Srednja šola za družboslovje in splošno kulturo Ljubljana, 1989, Slovenian

BOOKS & PUBLICATIONS

- Ravnikar's architecture, philosophy and lifestyle were and still are an intriguing topic for many architects and thinkers that came after him. Below is the list of some works on Ravnikar. The book Homage to Edvard Ravnikar, written by Ravnikar's sister Marta Ivanšek and her husband France Ivanšek, is the most comprehensive text on Ravnikar's life and work.
- Nika Grabar: Nove Benetke: natečaj za območje Tronchetto in temporalnost arhitekture (New Venice: the Tronchetto Area Competition and Temporality of Architecture) ANNALES Anali za istrske in mediteranske študije (Annales review for Istrian and Mediterranean Studies)
- Ivanšek France in Marta (1995): Homage à Edvard Ravnikar 1907–1993, Ljubljana: Fundacija Ivanšek OCLC 951288951
- Gollmann Karl Friderich (ed.) (1985): Edvard Ravnikar: Bauten Und Projekte. PhD dissertation/study. Technichen Universitat Graz
- Krečič Peter, Mušič Marko, Zupan Gojko (1996): Edvard Ravnikar: arhitekt, urbanist, oblikovalec, teoretik, univerzitetni učitelj, publicist. Arhitekturni muzej Ljubljana,

OCLC 500506889

- Metka Dolenc (2007), Slovenian design Education and Edvard Ravnikara "B Program" – Faculti of Philosophy Ljubljana, Archives d'Histoire de art, Zbornik za umetnostno zgodovino) (Art History Journal) No. 43, 2007
- Vodopivec Aleš and Žnidaršič Rok (Eds.) (2010): Edvard Ravnikar: architect and teacher, Wien: Springer-Verlag ISBN 978-3211992036, 3211992030
- Vodopivec Aleš (ed.) (2007): Edvard Ravnikar, Umetnost in arhitektura – a collection of esssys. Ljubljana: Založba Slovenska matica, Slovenian, ISBN 978-9612131692, 9612131694 OCLC 298725093
- Koselj Nataša (2007): Atlas Ravnikar Docomomo Slovenia, ISBN 978-9619229804
- Zupančič, Bogo, (2017): Plečnikovi študenti in drugi jugoslovanski arhitekti v Le Corbusierovem ateljeju, KUD Polis, Museum of Architecture and Design (MAO), 2018, ISBN 978-961-6669-47-4
- Koselj Nataša (2017): DOCOMOMO Slovenija 100, ISBN 9789612857936
- Tomaž Krušec (2002): Ureditev grobišča internirancev na otoku Rabu arh. Edvarda Ravnikarja – magistrsko delo FAGG
- Hočevar Marjan (et al.) (2018): PROSTOR za vse – anketa o Trgu republike (SPACE for all – a survey on the Republic Square), Ljubljana: Trajekt, zavod za prostorsko kulturo, ISBN 978-961-91897-4-0
- Cedilnik Alenka; Komac Urša; Ocvirk Marjan (1989): Delo arhitekta Edvarda Ravnikarja v Ljubljani. Ljubljana. Srednja šola za družboslovje in splošno kulturo
- Španjol Igor, Zabel Igor (ed.)(2003): To the Edge and Beyond: Slovenian Art 1975–1985, Ljubljana, Moderna galerija ISBN 961-2060339, 9789612060336
- Krečič Peter (1996): Edvard Ravnikar, exhibition catalogue, Ljubljana, Arhitekturni muzej Ljubljana

EXHIBITION CATALOGUES

- Stierli Martino, Kulić Vladimir (2018): Toward a Concrete Utopia: Architecture in Yugoslavia 1948–1980 MOMA NY Exhibition
- Zupančič Bogo (2012): The B course – reforming design, Ljubljana, Museum for Architecture and Design, 2012, COBISS.SI-ID – 264302080, OCLC 84001817
- Planišček Anja (ed.) (2010): Should this house really be like that? on the centenary of the birth of architect Edvard Ravnikar, Ljubljana Faculty of Architecture ISBN 9789616823074, 9616823078
- Ravnikar Edo Jr. (2008): Building beyond architecture, a catalogue of Slovenia's exhibit at the 11th International Architectural Exhibition in Venice, Italy. Ljubljana, Ambient d.o.o.
- Curtis William J. R., Krušec Tomaž, Vodopivec Aleš, (2004): Slovenia: Architect Edvard Ravnikar, Memorial Complex on the Island of Rab, 1953 – catalogue for Slovenia's exhibition on the 9th International Architectural Exhibition in Venice, Ljubljana, DESSA
- Španjol Igor, Zabel Igor (ed.)(2003): To the Edge and Beyond: Slovenian Art 1975–1985, Ljubljana, Moderna galerija ISBN 961-2060339, 9789612060336
- Krečič Peter (1996): Edvard Ravnikar, exhibition catalogue, Ljubljana, Arhitekturni muzej Ljubljana

== Awards and recognitions ==
Edvard Ravnikar was recognized for his talent early on. Immediately after World War II, he became a professor at the Faculty of Architecture in Ljubljana, Slovenia.

In 1955, during the early years of postwar reconstruction, he received The City of Ljubljana Award for architecture for his contribution to the reconstruction of Ljubljana and was also the Dean of The Faculty of Architecture in Ljubljana.

Six years later he was awarded the Prešeren Prize, the highest honor for artistic accomplishments in Slovenia, his first of two.

In 1963, he became a corresponding member of the Yugoslav Academy of Arts and Sciences and in 1969 a corresponding member of the Slovene Academy of Sciences and Arts. (Socialist Federal Republic of Yugoslavia) for his achievements in architecture. In 1973, he was appointed a member of the Association Internationale Le Corbusier in Geneva.

Two years later, in 1974, he was awarded his first Plečnik Prize for Architecture, the most important architectural prize in the country, bestowed by the Association of Architects of Slovenia, for the Revolution Square project.

In 1978, he was recognized for the same project by the Republic of Slovenia with his second Prešeren Prize. The next year he was finally elected a regular member of the Slovene Academy of Sciences and Arts, after years of politically motivated deferrals. Three years later, in 1982, he was honored by the State of Yugoslavia once more with the AVNOJ Award for Architecture.

In 1984, he was presented with The Borba newspaper award for the building of the Ivan Cankar Cultural Centre (Cankarjev Dom) in Ljubljana.

In 1985, after his retirement, he was named Professor Emeritus at the Faculty for Architecture, Civil Engineering and Geodesy in Ljubljana where he had been a lecturing professor since 1946.

In 1987, he received his second Plečnik Prize for architecture, in 1988 he received the Herder Prize for architecture in Vienna and he was awarded an honorary doctorate in technical sciences for technical achievements in architecture from the Graz School for Technical Sciences in Austria

Finally, in honor of his exceptional work, in 1990, he was made an honorary member of the Society of Slovene Architects.
