= Reporter (magazine) =

Reporter is a political magazine published in Slovenia. The magazine was first published in May 2008. The editors of the magazine are mostly former contributors of now-defunct Slovene magazine, Mag. Reporter is published on a weekly basis. The magazine has a rightist political stance.

== See also ==
- List of magazines in Slovenia
