= Muhaned Abu Khumra =

Iraqi writer and producer

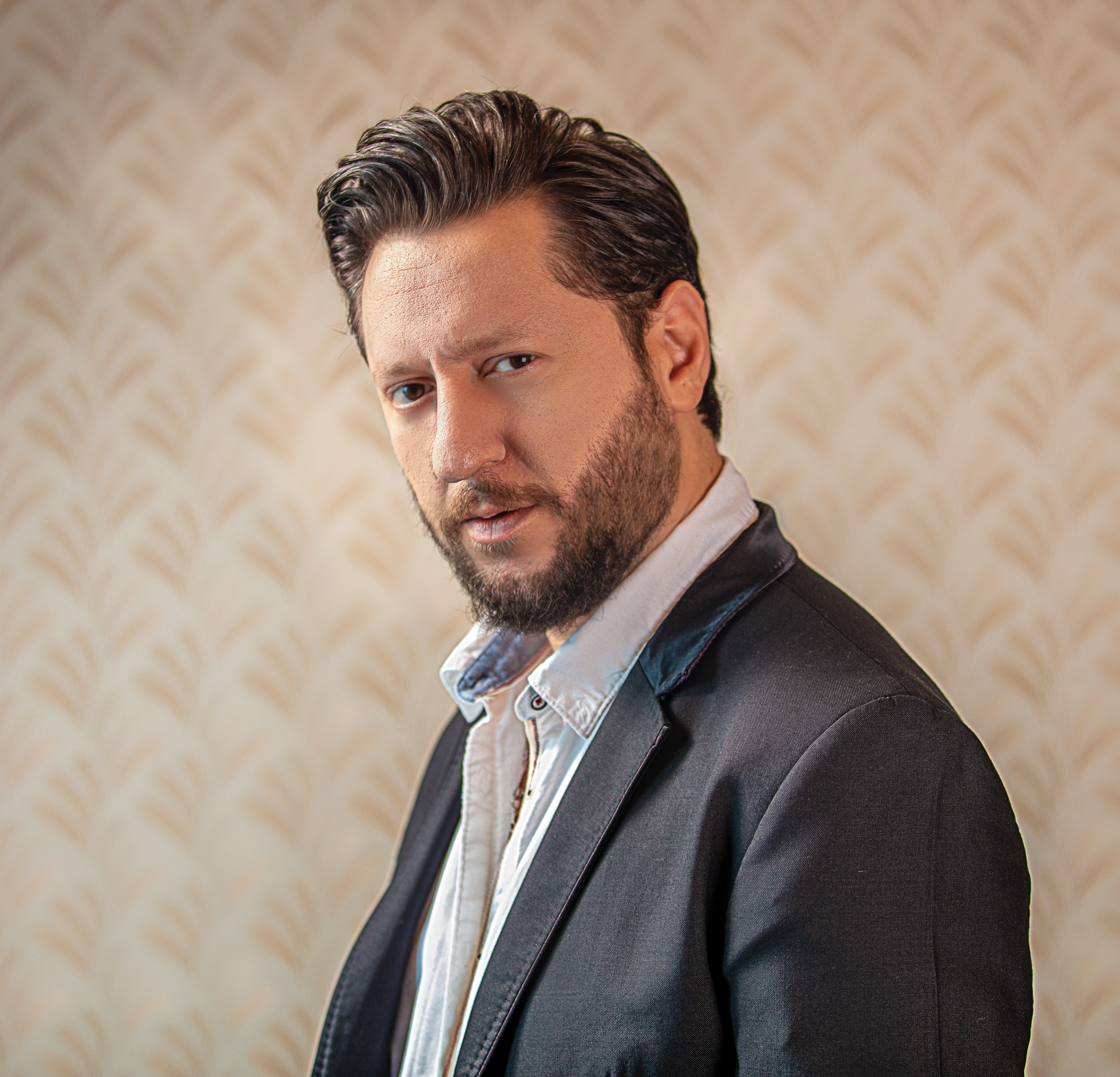
- Born: 5 April 1983 (age 42); Babylon, Iraq
- Occupations: Director, Writer, Producer
- Years active: 2006–present
- Known for: Hawa Baghdad
- Relatives: Ali Abu Khumra (brother)
- Website: www.muhaned.tv

Muhaned Abu Khumra (Arabic: مهند أبو خمرة) (born 5 April 1983) is an Iraqi director, writer, and producer. He is most prominently known for creating the television series Hawa Baghdad. His TV series became one of the most famous TV series in Iraq. His show has been broadcast on Al-Sharqiya.

== Early life ==
Abu Khumra was raised in Baghdad where he completed his studies. He then moved to the UAE where he established Etana TV Production with his brother the producer Ali Abu Khumra.

== Career ==
His first attribution in directing dramatic comedy shows was Znood El-Sett which was aired on Al Sharqiya TV, which was highly successful in Iraq and secured top place in the 2009 Iraqi viewership ratings. After that he directed many shows, as well as writing and directing Kanary, aired in 2010 on Al Sharqiya TV. Then he had the idea of producing the first Iraqi animation show, so produced El-Attak, also aired on Al Sharqiya TV, which broke the viewership rate on YouTube, and winning the prize for best show idea on Al Sharqiya TV. El-Attak became iconic in Iraq as the first Iraqi Animation show that aired on the TV.

In the same year, Abu Khumra shot the comedy TV Show Samba in Rio de Janeiro, which was the first Arabic and Iraqi TV show shot in Latin America. In 2012 Muhaned earned the best comedy show prize at the "Cairo Festival for Arabic Media" for The biggest liar. Muhaned directed this show with his brother Ali Abu Khumra using the latest cinematic cameras and the most up to date visual effect technologies for the first time in Iraq, followed by the second season of the same show which aired on Al Rasheed TV.

Among his satirical shows, he directed the TV show El-Rayes, which uses black comedy to criticize the political situation in Iraq. He also directed Shalash Men Hay El-Tenk and Habazbooz, and cooperated again with his brother Ali Abu Khumra in directing Abu El-Masayeb. Fashafeesh merged the characters and plot of Shalash and El-Attak. More recently Hawa Baghdad aired on Al Sharqiya TV in May 2019.

== Accolades ==
Abu Khumra has received numerous awards for his works. In June 2019, he received the award for Best Dramatic Work and Best Director for his contributions to the series Hawa Baghdad. In 2015, he received El Kartoosh on behalf of Etana for the best comedy series.

== Shows ==
- Znood Al Set زنود الست on Al Sharqiya.
- Samba سامبا on Al Sharqiya.
- Al Attak العتاك on Al Sharqiya.
- Al Rayes الريس on Al Sharqiya.
- Akbar Kaddab أكبر كذاب on Al Rasheed.
- Shalash Men Hay Al Tanak شلش من حي التنك on Al Sharqiya.
- Habazbooz حبزبوز on Al Sharqiya.
- Abu Al Musayeb أبو المصايب on Al Rasheed.
- Fashafeesh الفشافيش on Al Sharqiya.
- Hawa Baghdad هوى بغداد on Al Sharqiya.
