= Peter Zidar =

- Born: January 1968 (age 58); Ljubljana, Slovenia
- Occupations: Coordinator of EU projects, Chairman of Operators Group in UMTS Forum
- Known for: Author of "Universe Revealed" book

Peter Zidar is Slovenian popular science writer and coordinator of telecommunications projects.

He was chairman of Operators Group in UMTS Forum organization, where he was also a member of the Steering Board until 2016 when this organization stopped its activities. He was unanimously elected for this position in March 2008. He represented UMTS Forum's Operators Group and Telekom Slovenje as a speaker at many international conferences including events in Great Britain, USA, China, Russia, India, South Africa, Nigeria, Arab Emirates, Thailand, Ethiopia, Portugal, Netherlands, Poland, Czech Republic and Moldova. In March 2007 he was head of Slovenian national delegation on ETSI General Assembly in Nice.

He was main coordinator for two European FP7 projects SUNSEED and eBADGE which were both successfully concluded in 2016 and 2017. Each of these projects was having budget around 5 million EUR and they were both related to smartmeters research. In eBADGE 13 international partners participated, while in SUNSEED another 9 partners were involved.

He is author of more than 216 popular science articles in Slovenian monthly magazine "Življenje in tehnika" (Life and Technology) and other magazines and newspapers. From 2014 he is also member of editors board of "Življenje in tehnika" magazine.

He is an author of two books:

- a book about space exploration with title "Odstrto vesolje" (Universe Revealed). It was published in July 2008 (14,900 copies).
- a book about video games history with title "Kratka zgodovina videoiger" (A Brief History of Videogames) published in July 2011 (13,500 copies)
- a book about interstellar travel with title "Medzvezdna potovanja" (Interstellar Travel). It was published in July 2025 (4,800 copies).

From 2009 to 2016 he had 18 radio and one TV interview on Slovenian national radio and TV Radiotelevizija Slovenija regarding topics related to both published books
