= British International School of Ljubljana =

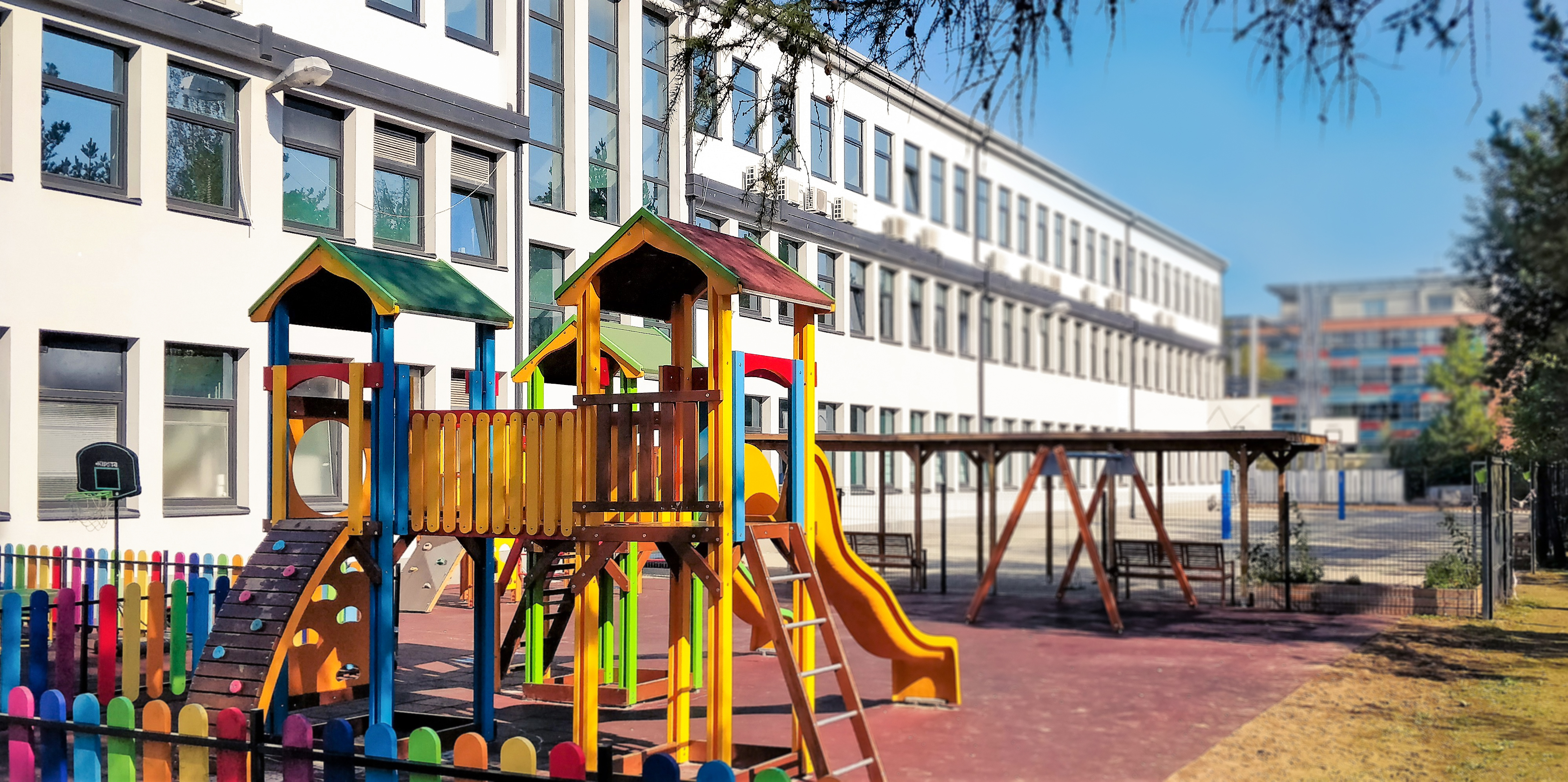

Location
- Cesta 24. junija 92, 1231 Ljubljana-Črnuče; Ljubljana; 46.0953°N 14.5260°E

Information
- School type: British International School
- Established: 2008
- Principal: Mel Hitchcocks
- Age range: 3–18
- Student to teacher ratio: 5:1
- Language: English
- Area: 1,127 m² (main building)
- Website: https://britishschool.si

The British International School of Ljubljana (BISL) is a school in Slovenia that caters to over 230 students from over 40 nationalities, ranging from 3 to 18 years of age. It welcomed its first students in 2008 and became an executive member of COBIS in 2013. BISL is a CAIE international school and a regular member of Council of International Schools.

== History ==
The school was established in 2008 by Jeremy Hibbins, who also served as the school principal. After his death in a car accident in 2013, he was succeeded as principal in 2014 by David Cooksey. In 2014, BISL relocated from Ljubljana's Bežigrad District to the Vič District. BISL was purchased by the Orbital Education Group of schools in 2015, and that year David Cooksey was succeeded as principal by Karl Wilkinson. In 2016, the school relocated once again, to Ljubljana's Črnuče District. Paul Walton succeeded Karl Wilkinson as principal in 2018. That same year, The Slovenia Times interviewed Walton on his vision for an internally recognized curriculum that goes beyond the classroom. In March 2021, the British International School of Ljubljana became an 'Outstanding' school in every category, following its successful BSO inspection. Matthew Cox succeeded Paul Walton as principal in 2022.

== Curriculum ==
The school follows the English National Curriculum.

The primary curriculum is based on the English National Curriculum and enriched through a topic-based approach. The secondary curriculum is based on the English National Curriculum and culminating in external (I)GCSE and A Level examinations. The school also encourages students to take on leadership roles though a student council or participating in the International Award for Young People, known in Slovenia as the MEPI and in the UK as the Duke of Edinburgh's Award. Students regularly take part in competitions around the world, including the annual COBIS Poetry Competition and the World Scholar's Cup.

== Location ==
The British International School of Ljubljana is located in Ljubljana's Črnuče District in a repurposed factory building (formerly part of the Elma transformer company). The immediate surroundings include squatters' gardens to the west, the Črnuče Sewage Treatment Plant (Čistilna naprava Črnuče) to the northwest, the Ljubljana Tobacco Company (Tobačna Ljubljana) to the north, and various commercial and industrial buildings to the east. The forested Tomačevo Gravel Bank (Tomačevski prod) lies to the south. The school has recently undergone expansion of its facilities with the addition of a third floor and an outdoor woodland area.
