= Zahraa Ben Mime =

Iraq-Tunisian actress

Zahra Ben Mime
- زهراء بن ميم
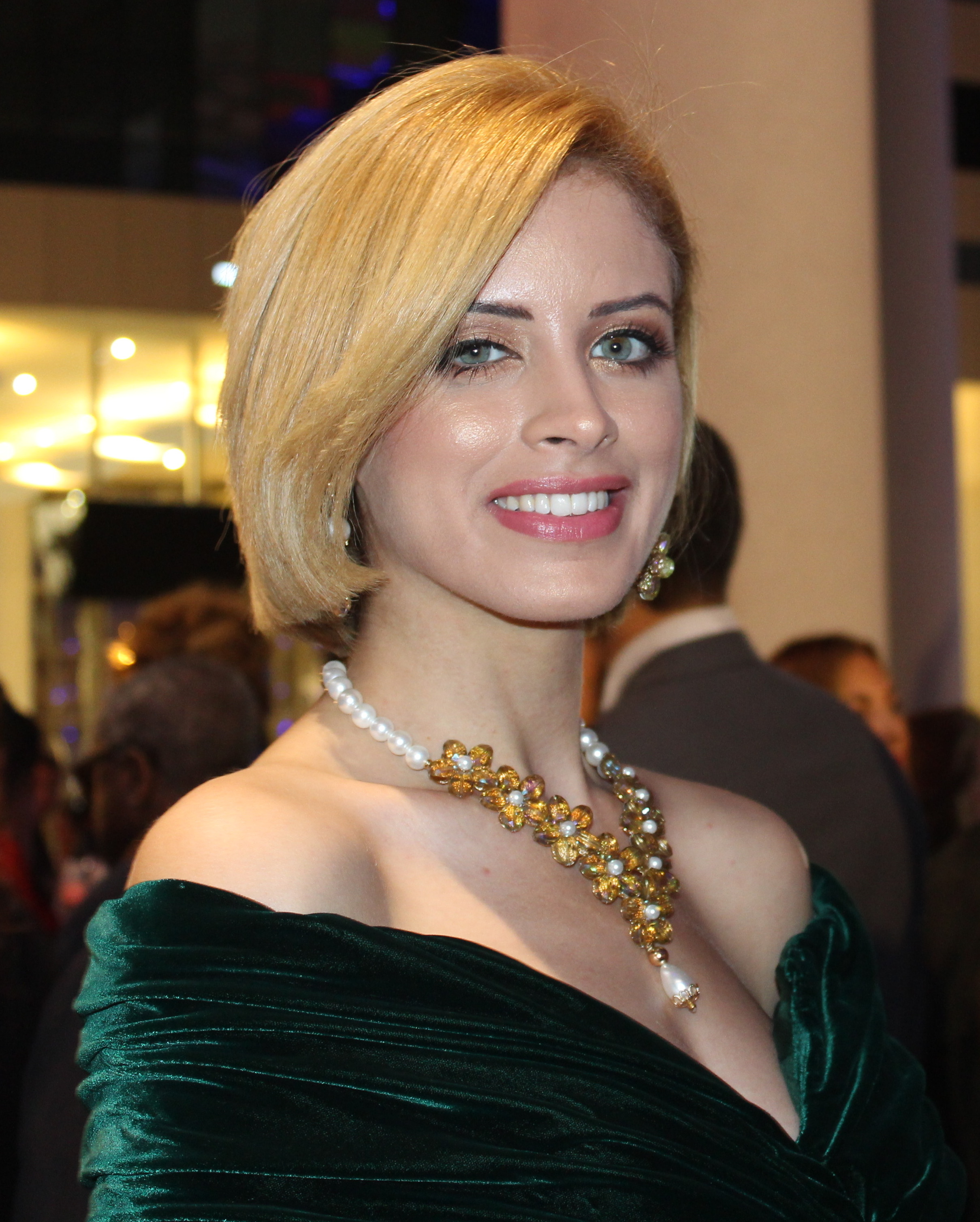
- Zahra Ben Mime, 2018 Carthage Film Festival
- Born: Zahra Ben Mime; September 30, 1989 (age 36); Baghdad, Iraq
- Education: Syrian Virtual University
- Occupations: actress, presenter, model, producer
- Years active: 2009-present
- Known for: Hawa Baghdad
- Children: 3

Zahra Ben Mime (Arabic: زهراء بن ميم; born 30 September 1989) is an Iraqi presenter and model. She is known for her role in Hawa Baghdad.

== Early life ==
She was born in Baghdad to a Tunisian father from Sousse and an Iraqi mother from Al Diwaniyah. She lived in Baghdad until the age of six and then emigrated with her father to Damascus in Syria where she lived for thirteen years during which she completed her studies. In 2007, she emigrated to Tunisia where she began her professional career.

== Career ==
She began her career as a model appearing in music videos and advertisements in 2009. In 2011, she became a presenter and producer working with Tunisian TV channels like El Watania 1 and Ettounsiya TV. In 2017, she turned to acting with her first role in the Tunisian TV series The Vortex. Her most prominent role was in the Iraqi TV series Hawa Baghdad which aired in 2019. She appeared with American actor Esser West, and won a Golden Crescent Award for best young Iraqi actress.

== Personal life ==
Her husband is Iraqi, and the couple have three children (two sons and one daughter). She has a younger sister. She gained Iraqi citizenship in February, 2023. She participated in the Iraqi protests in 2019.

== Works ==
=== TV series ===
Year	Name	Arabic name	role
2017	The vortex	الدوامة	Hala
2019	Hawa Baghdad	هوى بغداد	Shams
2021	Tigris and Euphrates: tales from Hawa Baghdad	هوى بغداد	

=== TV shows ===
Year	Name	Channel
2013	Sehat Shrebatkom	Ettounsiya TV
2017	Weather news	El Watania 1
2017	Sport Sunday	El Watania 1
