= Alaa Hussein =

Iraqi actor

- آلاء حسين
- Born: January 10, 1980 (age 46); Baghdad, Ba'athist Iraq
- Education: University of Baghdad
- Occupations: Visual Artist, Actress
- Years active: 1998 - present

Alaa Hussein (Arabic: آلاء حسين; born 10 January 1980) is an Iraqi actress, and visual artist. She is best known for her roles on the comedic show "Zaraq Waraq", which aired on Al-Sharqiyah since 2014.

== Early life ==
Hussein was born in Baghdad, She attended the University of Baghdad and received a bachelor's degree of Fine arts BFA, in 2005.

== Filmography ==
Television roles
Year	Title	Role	Notes
2012	Selima Pasha	Selima Murad	
2014–2019	Zaraq Waraq	Various	
2016–2017	The Shock	Host	Iraq segment
2019 - present	Hamed Helou	Various	
