= Družina =

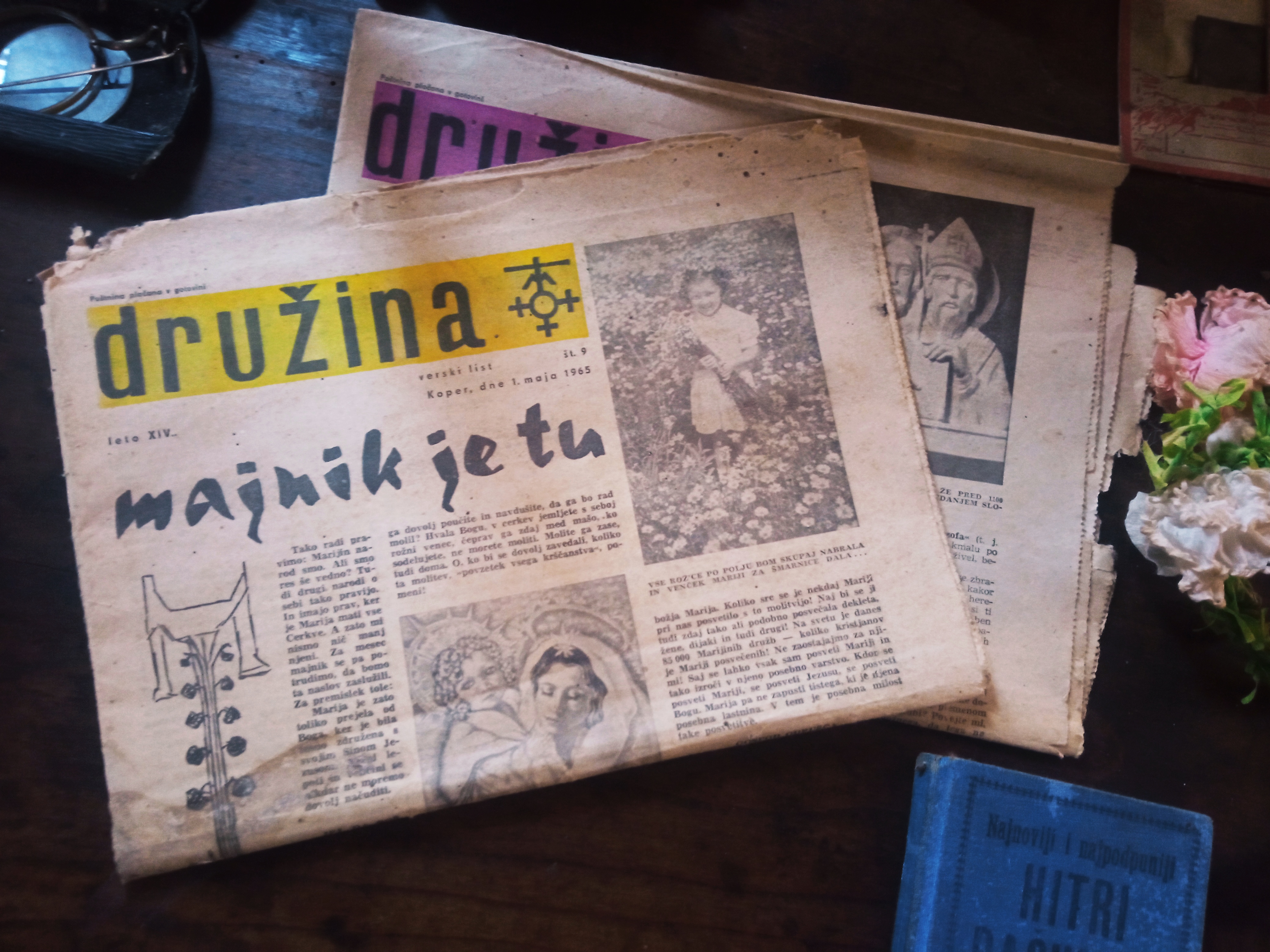
- May 1965 issue.
- Editor: Franci Petrič
- Frequency: Weekly
- First issue: 1952
- Country: Slovenia
- Language: Slovene
- Website: www.druzina.si

Družina (meaning Family in English) is a Slovenian weekly Roman Catholic magazine.

== History and profile ==
Družina was launched as a biweekly magazine in 1952; since 1998 there has also been an online version. Its publisher is the Roman Catholic Church in Slovenia. The magazine later began to be published weekly.

At the beginning of the 2000s Družina published articles against single-parent families and same-sex families.

According to the National Research on Readership, in 2010 Družina was read weekly by 97,000 people.

== See also ==
- List of magazines in Slovenia
