= UMTS Forum =

UMTS Forum is an open cross sector and independent organization founded on 16 December 1996 in Zürich, Switzerland, as a non-profit association under Swiss law with the aim to enhance the modular 3G/UMTS concept, which takes full regard of the trend of convergence of existing and future information networks, devices and services, and the potential synergies that can be derived from such convergence.

Following successful global implementation of UMTS, focus changed to upgrades and evolution of UMTS. Currently mobile operators are implementing HSPA (High Speed Packet Access), which will be followed by LTE (Long Term Evolution). This change is also reflected in activities of UMTS Forum.

UMTS Forum is very active in different standardization and regulation organizations like ITU, ETSI/3GPP, EC and CEPT (European Conference of Postal and Telecommunications Administrations.

== Steering Group ==
- Jean-Pierre Bienaimé, Chairman
- Thomas Sidenbladh, Vice Chairman
- Guillaume Lebrun, Spectrum Aspects Group Chairman
- Cengiz Evci, Chairman Manufacturers Group
- Peter Zidar, Chairman Operators Group
- Werner Wiedermann, Vice Chairman Operators Group
- Adrian Scrase, ETSI Observer
