= The Shock (TV program) =

- Genre: Hidden camera
- Presented by: Alaa Huusein; Karim Kojak
- Countries of origin: Egypt; Iraq; Jordan; Lebanon; Saudi Arabia; Syria; Tunisia; United Arab Emirates
- Original language: Arabic
- No. of seasons: 2
- No. of episodes: 60

Original release
- Network: MBC 1
- Release: 2016 – 2017

The Shock (Arabic: الصدمة), is a hidden camera reality television television program which was broadcast on MBC 1, debuting during Ramadan 2016, and airing through Ramadan of 2017. The program was presented by Alaa Huusein and Karim Kojak.

== Cast ==
- Alaa Huusein
- Karim Kojak
- Khaled Alsaqer
- Turki Al Yousef
- Tarek Sweid
- Ahmed Landolsi
- Nancy Khoury

== Morocco controversy ==
After the success of the first season, the team decided to add other countries to the list of countries in which the program is being filmed. The country was chosen from the Persian Gulf, Jordan and Europe from Germany, then from North Africa, Morocco, but the latter replaced Tunisia until the last words. After the "Moroccan Ministry of Communication" refused to grant the license to the team, citing that "the program discredits Morocco and that it affects the rights of women and children."
