= Ayad Radhi =

Iraqi actor (born 1964)

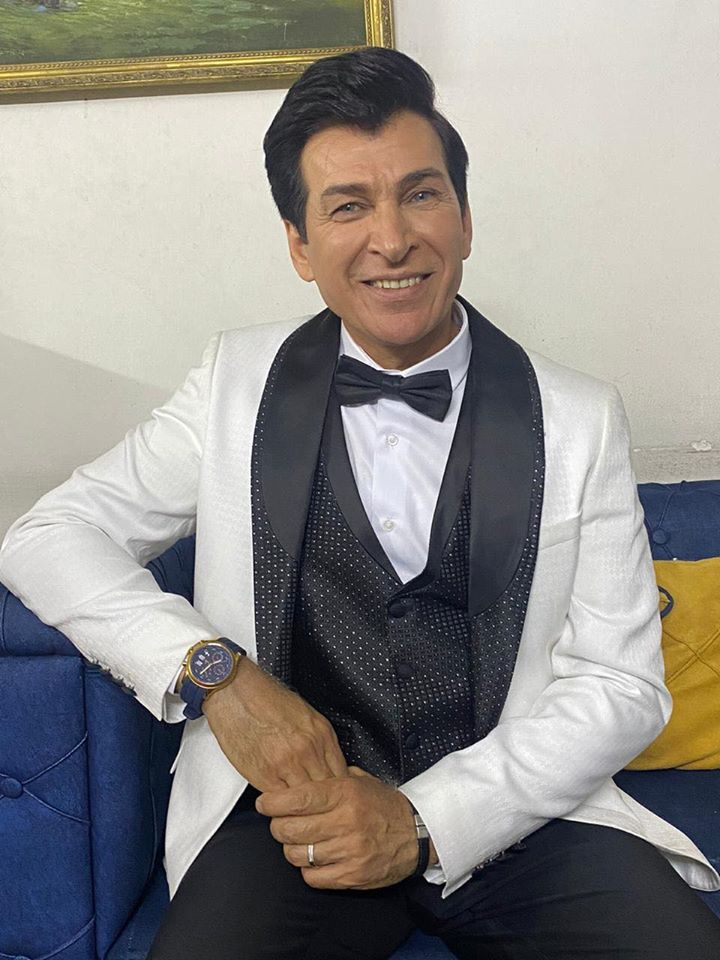
- Ayad Radhi in 2020
- Born: February 22, 1964 (age 62); Nasiriyah, Iraq
- Occupation: Actor
- Years active: 1985–present

Ayad Radhi Moenis Al Majidi (Arabic: اياد راضي مؤنس الماجدي, February 22, 1964 in Nasiriyah in Dhi Qar Governorate) is an Iraqi stage, film and television actor. He graduated from The Academy of Fine Arts in Baghdad in 1987. Radhi married in 1986 and he has four children.

== Television ==
- Love and Peace (Iraqi serial) (2009)
- Shanashel Haretna (2010)
- Film Hindi (2010)
- Samba (2011)
- Sandeqja (2011)
- The president (2012)
- Midday stars (2012)
- The Biggest Liar (2012–2013)
- Blue and Paper (2014)
- Crazyes family (2014)
- Zarak Warak (2014–2019)
- Shl'e Qala'e (2019)
- Kamamat Al-Watan (2020–2021)
- Ma mat Al-Watan (2022)
- Muhtawa Khabit (2023)

== Awards ==
- Won the Best actor award at the Golden Crescent Award in Baghdad in 2019.
