= Računalniške novice =

- Categories: Computer magazine
- Frequency: Biweekly
- Publisher: STROMBOLI, marketing, d.o.o.
- Founded: 1996
- Company: STROMBOLI, marketing, d.o.o.
- Country: Slovenia
- Based in: Medvode
- Language: Slovene
- Website: Official website
- ISSN: 1408-4872
- OCLC: 443090691

Računalniške novice is a Slovenian computer magazine.

== Profile ==
Računalniške novice was established in 1996. It is issued biweekly. The owner and publisher is STROMBOLI, marketing, d.o.o.

It sells computer hardware, software, and microchips from around the world as well as video games and game equipment.

== See also ==
- List of magazines in Slovenia
