= Mags McCarthy =

Irish country singer

- Born: 1989; County Cork, Ireland
- Genres: Country

Mags McCarthy (born 1989/1990) is an Irish country singer.

== Early life ==
McCarthy grew up on a family farm in Dripsey, County Cork, Ireland, where she milked cows and tended to cattle. Her grandfather (who died when she was two years old) played the fiddle. She uses his fiddle, reported to be 134 years old in 2020, when playing music. Her interest in performing began at age four, where she started Irish dancing classes and began playing the fiddle. McCarthy lived in Los Angeles for a short time in 2010.

She spent three years as a lead with Rhythm of the Dance and completed post-graduate studies in ethnomusicology at University College Cork. McCarthy taught music at the Terence MacSwiney Community College in Knocknaheeny, Cork. As of 2020, she was 30 years of age.

== Music career ==
In 2016, during a two-week holiday, McCarthy initially travelled to Nashville to record 16 of her original songs. Later, in 2017, McCarthy moved fulltime to Nashville where she met Dolly Parton and Parton's management team. McCarthy was given the chance to play at the Grand Ole Opry and later played at the Wildhorse Saloon and Country Music Association Festival. She was also invited to perform for U.S President Barack Obama in the White House on St Patrick’s Day, which she counted as the "highlight of her career".

She has received invitations to perform before other dignitaries such as the President of Ireland, the Mayor of Shanghai, members of the British Royal family and the European Parliament in Brussels.

In 2020, her single, a cover of Dolly Parton’s Light of a Clear Blue Morning, reached number 37 in the US country charts, and number 1 on the Hot Disc European Top 40 chart. During the COVID-19 pandemic, she was back home at her family farm in Dripsey and said that she was delighted to drive around in her Massey Ferguson 35.
