= Življenje in tehnika =

Science magazine

Življenje in tehnika (Life & Technology) is a Slovene-language monthly magazine about popular science. It has been published since 1950, at first under the name Ljudska tehnika (The Technology of the People). In 1952, it was renamed to its current title. It is still one of the magazines with the greatest readership in Slovenia. The magazine focuses mainly on engineering, medicine, biology, archeology and computer science. It is published by Tehniška založba Slovenije (Slovenian Technical Publishing).

== See also ==
- List of magazines in Slovenia
