= Magnology =

Community convention in Germany

MAG
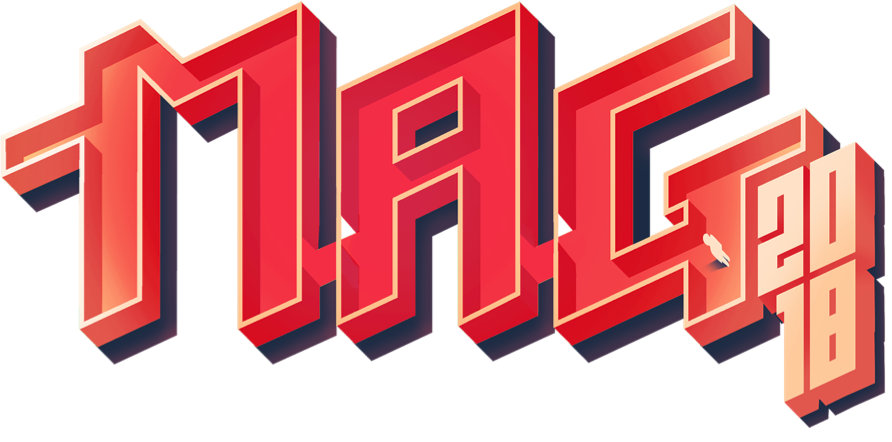
- Status: Active
- Genre: Gaming, anime/manga, influencers, cosplay
- Venue: Messe Erfurt (MAG Erfurt) previously Cruise Center HafenCity (Magnology)
- Locations: Erfurt, Germany (MAG Erfurt); Hamburg, Germany (MaGnology 2015-2017)
- Country: Germany
- Inaugurated: June 5, 2015; 11 years ago (as Magnology); March 26, 2018 (MAG)
- Most recent: MAG 2018, Erfurt, Germany
- Attendance: 10,000+ (2018, MAG 2018)
- Organizer: Super Crowd Entertainment GmbH
- Website: www.mag-con.de

The MAG (originally known as MaGnology) is a community convention in Germany with a focus on various fan cultures, including video games, anime, manga, influencers, cosplay. The MAG convention is held annually in Erfurt, Germany. The inspiration for the current MAG concept as a community convention came from shareholders' experience at other, overcrowded conventions in Germany and their desire to create a comfortable space for fans to meet their favourite creators.

The defining pillars of the MAG include the Fangress, a three-day-long workshop, keynotes, Q&A, and panels programme; as well as the presence of high-profile influencers and creators, exhibitors from the games, manga, anime and influencer industry; an Artist Alley where over 100 artists showcase their own creations; a cosplay contest; and a Lolita Fashion tea party organized by the largest German Lolita Fashion association, Court of Fables.

== History ==
The first MAG, known at the time as MaGnology, was originally created by Hiro Yamada as a games, comics, manga and Japanese culture convention. It was held on June 5–7, 2015 in Hamburg, Germany, at the brand academy. The following year, the event was held at the Museum für Kunst und Gewerbe Hamburg in July as a co-program for the Hokusai Manga exhibition in the museum. In 2017, the company MaGnology UG was founded by Hiro Yamada, Henning Kroll and THREAKS, which organized the third installment of the convention. It was held at the Hamburg Cruise Center and an estimated 3.500 visitors attended.

After the success of the 2017 edition, MAG announced that it would be moving to Erfurt, Germany for the foreseeable future. The official reason for the move away from Hamburg was stated as being the inability to find agreeable terms with the city of Hamburg in order to expand the convention.

On June 7, 2018, it was announced that the MaGnology UG was being rebranded as Super Crowd Entertainment GmbH with two additional shareholders—the German influencer agency 2nd Wave, and one of the top German gaming influencers PietSmiet.

== Content ==
The MAG takes place over three days and focuses on several pillars, including the Fangress, Artist Alley, creators, Lolita tea party, anime, manga and cosplay. Each pillar is designed to cater for one or more communities and appropriate content is presented for each.

The MAG is open to all ages, with children under the age of 8 given free access to the entire convention. To view content rated USK 12+ and higher, visitors will be required to show a proof of age armband which they receive at the entrance.

=== Fangress ===
Located in the congress center of Messe Erfurt and on the stages of each hall, MAG offers catered content for each community. Visitors can attend any workshop, panel, Q&A, and keynote without any additional fee. Experts of their respective fields are invited to host these sessions, allowing fans and professionals alike to join and learn.

=== Artist Alley ===
Like other anime and manga conventions, MAG invites international artists of comic, manga, fashion and more to exhibit on their show floor. These artists are a mix of professionals and amateurs who are able to sell their creations to MAG visitors.
