= Azzaman =

Iraqi newspaper

Azzaman الزمان
- Type: Daily newspaper
- Format: Print, online
- Editor-in-chief: Saad al Bazzaz
- Political alignment: Pan-Arab
- Language: Arabic
- Headquarters: London, Baghdad, Amman
- Website: http://www.azzaman.com/

Azzaman (Arabic: الزَمان meaning The Time) is a daily Iraqi newspaper published simultaneously in Baghdad by Saad al Bazzaz.

== Influence and views ==
A recent poll conducted by researchers at Baghdad University found that readers in southern Iraq regard the Arab-language Azzaman as "neutral and independent" as well as "highly objective", and that it is the most popular news source in the area.

== Controversy ==
In 2005, Azzaman lost a libel lawsuit, and issued strong retractions of its previous allegations against Mozah bint Nasser Al Missned. It emerged during the trial that the paper had accepted money from Saudi authorities to do propaganda and intelligence work for the Saudi government. Azzaman and Bazzaz agreed to pay £10,000 in damages and £500,000 in costs to her solicitors.
