= Dolenjski list =

Slovenian news magazine

Dolenjski list is a regional Slovenian news magazine covering Dolenjska, South Central Slovenia. The magazine was started in 1950. Its headquarters is in Novo Mesto. It is published on a weekly basis, and its website was launched in 1996.

In 1997 Dolenjski list was acquired by Andrej Bartelj, becoming part of the Salomon 2000 company. Skupina Krater d.d. owns the magazine.
