= Moj mikro =

Slovene-language computer magazine

- March 1986 cover
- Categories: Computer magazine
- Frequency: Monthly
- Circulation: 10,000 (2008)
- Publisher: Delo Revije, d. d.
- Founder: Žiga Turk
- Founded: 1984; 42 years ago
- Final issue: July 2015; 10 years ago
- Country: Slovenia
- Language: Slovene
- Website: defunct www.mojmikro.si

Moj mikro was a monthly Slovene-language computer magazine published in Slovenia. It was in circulation between 1984 and 2015. Moj mikro was one of the most popular IT magazines in Yugoslavia during the 80's, spanning a large variety of technology topics and was published in Slovenian and Serbo-Croatian (until 1991).

== Profile ==
Moj mikro was established in 1984. The founding editor was Žiga Turk. Delo Revije, d. d. was the publisher. The magazine was published monthly. It targeted men between 14 and 64 years of age.

In 2008 the magazine had a circulation of 10,000 copies.

== See also ==
- List of magazines in Slovenia
