= Babylon Rotana Baghdad Hotel =

Hotel in Al-Jadriya, Baghdad, Iraq

- فندق بابل روتانا (Arabic)
- Babylon Rotana Baghdad Hotel, 2016
- Interactive map of the Babylon Rotana Baghdad Hotel area
- Hotel chain: Rotana Hotels

General information
- Architectural style: Yugoslav Modernism
- Location: Baghdad, Iraq
- Coordinates: 33.2911°N 44.3904°E
- Opening: 1982
- Owner: Al Ibaa Company
- Operator: Rotana Hotels

Technical details
- Floor count: 16

Design and construction
- Architects: Edvard Ravnikar together with Majda Kregar, Edo Ravnikar Jr & Miha Kerin
- Architecture firm: Lovćeninženjering
- Main contractor: Elliniki Techniki S.A.

Other information
- Number of rooms: 284
- Number of restaurants: 6

Website
- www.rotana.com/rotanahotelandresorts/iraq/baghdad/babylonrotana

The Babylon Rotana Baghdad Hotel is a 284-room hotel on the banks of the Tigris River, in the Al-Jadriya district of Baghdad, Iraq.

== History ==
The hotel's architecture is a Ziggurat, in the form of a terraced step pyramid of successively receding stories or levels. It was designed by Slovenian architect Edvard Ravnikar and was originally intended to be built as a beach resort at Budva in Montenegro, in Socialist Federal Republic of Yugoslavia. When that project fell through, the plans were re-used and slightly adjusted for the new site in Baghdad.

The hotel originally opened in 1982 as The Babylon Oberoi, managed by Oberoi Hotels & Resorts. The interiors were designed by Indian architect Sunita Kohli. Oberoi severed their connection with the hotel due to the 1991 Gulf War. On January 25, 2010, the Babylon Hotel was the site of a car bomb attack. The hotel joined the Warwick Hotels and Resorts chain in October 2014 as the Babylon Warwick Hotel. On May 29, 2015, it was hit by another deadly car bomb attack. On January 9, 2019, the hotel ended its contract with Warwick Hotels and Resorts, signed a contract with Rotana Hotels on January 20, 2019. The hotel was renamed Babylon Rotana Baghdad Hotel on February 1, 2019.
