= Avtomanija =

- Editor-in-Chief: Artur Švarc
- Deputy Editor-in-Chief: Peter Pirkovič
- MotoGP Editor: Matic Kovačič
- Categories: Automotive news; Vehicle reviews; Motorsports coverage
- Frequency: Magazine published weekly
- Format: Website; Print magazine
- Founded: 1998
- Country: Slovenia
- Language: Slovene
- Website: www.avtomanija.com

Avtomanija is the leading Slovene automobile internet portal and magazine (2005-2010). The content is divided between automotive news, vehicle reviews, and motorsports coverage. Originally only a motoring website since 1998, expanded to magazine publishing in 2005. In the 2006, under the direction of longtime editor Artur Švarc, changed its name from Avtomania to Avtomanija, 32 page magazine published weekly. Name was changed due incorrect spelling of the word, which was in original partially English and partially Slovenian. Avtomanija was up to date Slovenia's only weekly automotive magazine.
