= Al Sharqiya =

Al-Sharqiya الشرقية
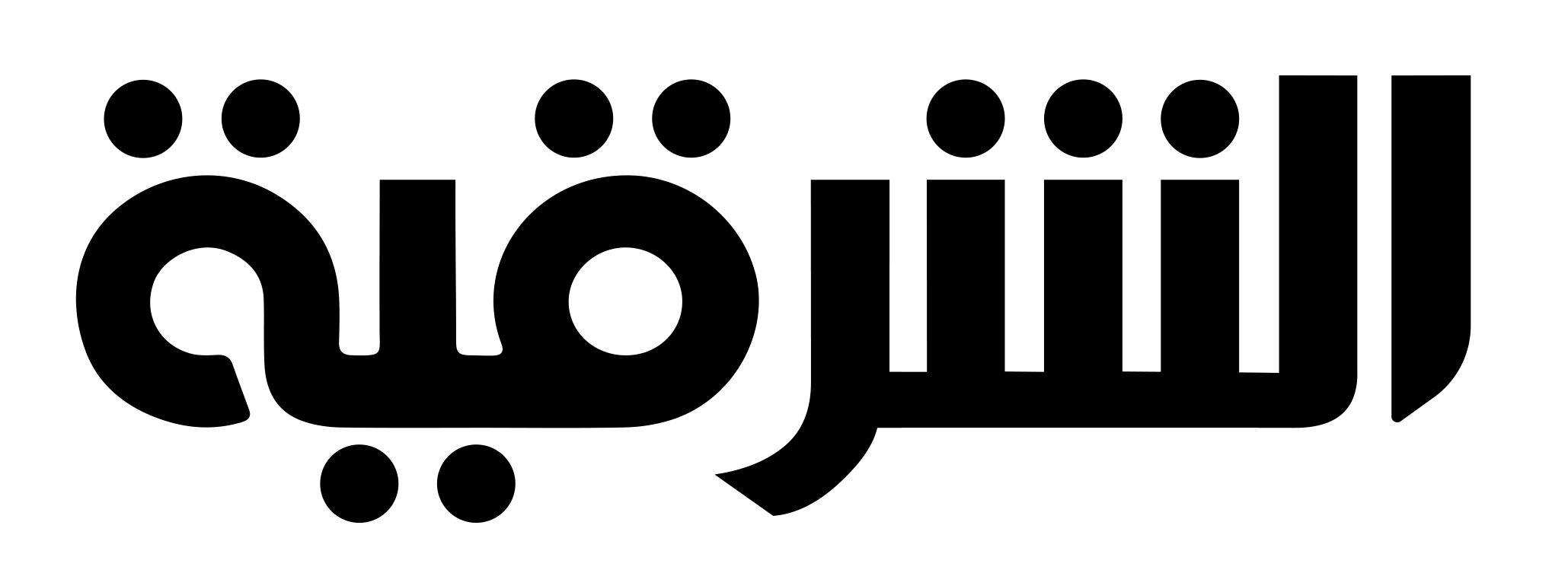
- Country: Iraq
- Broadcast area: Worldwide, via satellite and internet
- Headquarters: Baghdad

Programming
- Language: Arabic
- Picture format: 1080i HDTV

Ownership
- Owner: Saad al-Bazzaz

History
- Launched: March 2004; 22 years ago

Links
- Website: https://www.alsharqiya.com/en

Availability

Streaming media
- Live stream: https://www.alsharqiya.com/ar/sharqiya-live

Al Sharqiya ("The Eastern One") (Arabic: الشرقية) is Iraq's first privately owned satellite channel.

Baghdad and Dubai-based Iraqi media tycoon Saad al-Bazzaz, is a well-known sunni political opponent from Mosul. Al-Bazzaz is also the Editor in Chief of the Azzaman newspaper. The station was launched in March 2004 and began regular transmission on 4 May 2004. The Shia militias used to call the channel, Al-Baathiya (Baathist), due to the relationship of Saad Al-Bazzaz with the former Baathist president Saddam Hussein.

Al Sharqiya now has been gaining a growing audience with its mixture of popular current affairs, satire and Iraq's first reality TV programs.

The satellite channel with the greatest reach in Iraq, according to a June Ipsos-Stat poll, is the Saudi-owned news channel Al Arabiya with 41 percent reach, followed by private Iraqi satellite channel Al Sharqiya at 40 percent.

The former logo of Al Sharqiya from early March 2005 until at the middle of 2014.

Sharqiya's founder says his current staff of 400 hopes to capture a wide audience by using political comedy and the kind of impartial news coverage unheard of during decades of rule by ousted head of state Saddam Hussein.

Since its formation in March 2004, the channel has gained a reputation for its humanitarian assistance and charity work which has been aimed at cities all over Iraq. As part of a programme called ‘Reputation and Capital’ (Saya’o Surmuiya) Al Sharqiya distributed a number of grants to small-scale projects that assist the needy and disabled around Iraq. The distribution of these grants around Iraq were as follows: 39% to Basra, 10% Najaf, 10% Baghdad, 7% Amara, 6% Karbala, 5% Kut, 4% Babylon, 4% Mosul, 3% Nasriya, 3% Kirkuk 5% Other cities.

The channel's line up for the holy month of Ramadan, including humanitarian programmes, comedies, dramas, satires, music and religion is widely watched in Iraq. Monetary aid dispensed during Ramadan to 90 of the poorest families in Iraq, equated to 1 million dollars in August 2010.

In August 2008 four staff were killed in Mosul whilst on assignment. The channel's head of news, Ali Wajih, blamed the Iraqi Government's al-Iraqiyyah channel, saying their "campaign of slander" against the channel was "morally responsible" for the killings.

Al Sharqiya TV was fined $87,000 on the 12th of August 2009 for falsely reporting that orders had been issued to arrest ex-detainees recently released by the United States. Maj. Gen. Qassim al-Moussawi, the main military spokesman in Baghdad, insisted he said only that ex-detainee files would be reviewed to determine if any of them were involved in a recent uptick in bombings.
