= Mag (Slovenian magazine) =

Slovenian weekly political magazine (1995–2010)

- Categories: Political magazine
- Frequency: Weekly
- Publisher: Salomon 2000 publishing house
- Founded: 1995
- Final issue: May 2010
- Company: Salomon 2000
- Country: Slovenia
- Based in: Ljubljana
- Language: Slovene

Mag was a Slovenian language weekly news and political magazine published in Ljubljana, Slovenia, between 1995 and 2010.

== History and profile ==
Mag was first published in 1995. The magazine was based in Ljubljana and was published on a weekly basis. The weekly provided political news.

The last publisher and owner of the magazine was the Delo publishing house which bought it in 2006. In December 2007 the weekly was sold to Salomon 2000 which also published it.

In early years Mag was a right-wing conservative publication. However with the dismissal of the editor-in-chief in late 2007 it became a left liberal and centrist magazine.

In 2003 the circulation of Mag was 17,000 copies, making it the second best-selling weekly in the country. In 2007 the magazine sold 16,500 copies. In 2008 its readership was 36,000. The magazine became a supplement to daily Delo in 2009. In May 2010 Mag ceased publication.

== See also ==
- List of magazines in Slovenia
