= The Slovenia Times =

Monthly Slovenian magazine (2003–2020)

- Frequency: Monthly
- First issue: 1 March 2003
- Final issue: 2020 (print)
- Company: Slovenian Press Agency
- Country: Slovenia
- Based in: Ljubljana
- Language: English
- Website: sloveniatimes.com
- ISSN: 1581-6389
- OCLC: 446400306

The Slovenia Times is an online news magazine about Slovenia that is run by the Slovenian Press Agency. It started out as a monthly print magazine published in Ljubljana, Slovenia, between 2003 and 2020, when it became an online-only publication.

== History and profile ==
The Slovenia Times was first published in March 2003. The owner of the magazine was the Government Relations and Media Office. The magazine was published quarterly by Domus d.o.o. and provided news on the Slovene society concerning business and social topics, culture, sports, with a special reference to economy. Its headquarters was in Ljubljana. The magazine offered several annual publications. It ceased the printed edition in 2020 becoming an online publication which publishes news and articles daily. In November 2022 it was acquired by the Slovenian Press Agency.
