= Ali Abu Khumra =

Iraqi director

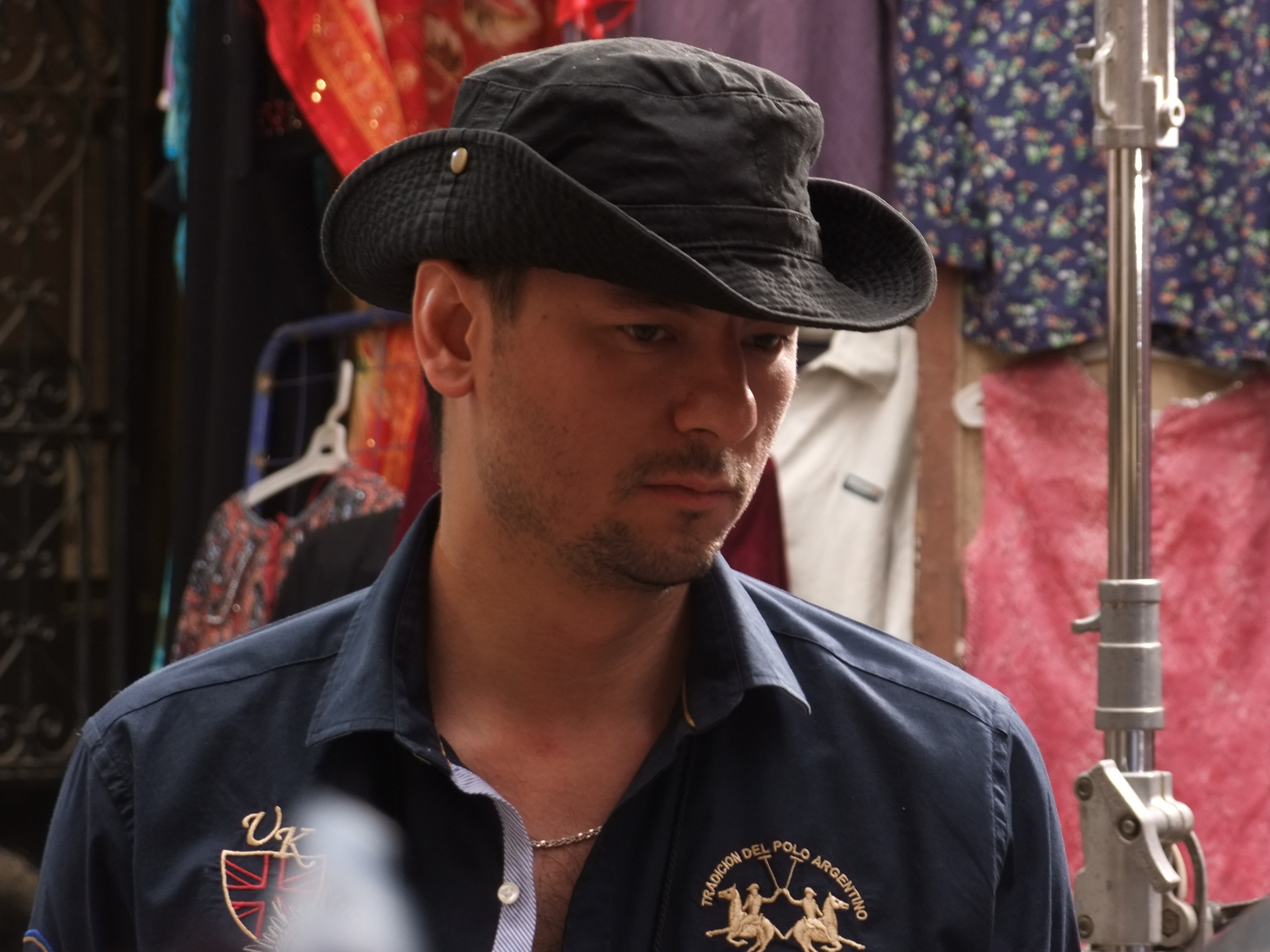
- Born: Ali Saad Hameed Abu Khumra; 15 November 1981 (age 44); Babylon Province, Iraq
- Occupations: Film director, executive producer
- Years active: 1998–present

Ali Abu Khumra (born 15 November 1981) is an Iraqi director and executive producer. He is co-founder and owner of the Dubbai-based production company called Etana Production located in Dubai Media City.

== Early life and career ==
Khumra was born in Babylon Province on 15 November 1981. His parents were both engineers and had three sons.

After Khumra moved to the UAE, he and his brother founded Etana Production for television and film.
