= Naša žena =

Women's magazine in Slovenia (1941–2015)

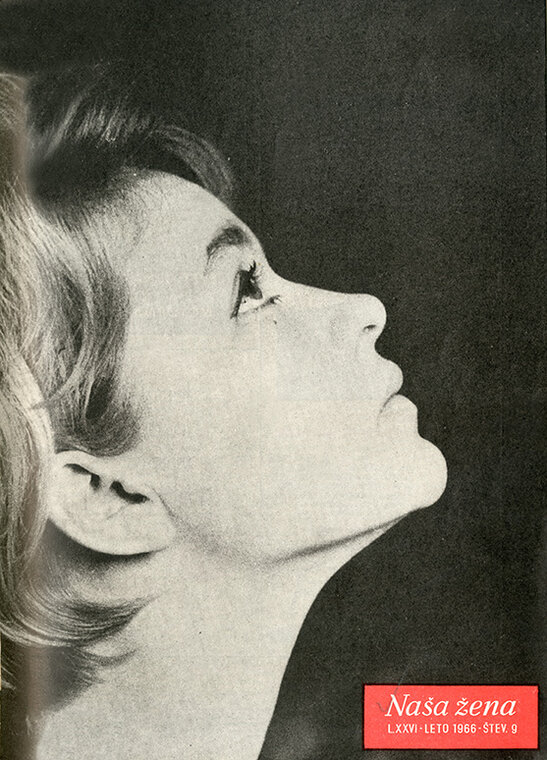
- Summer 1966 cover of Naša žena's 76th issue featuring Milena Dravić
- Categories: Women's magazine
- Frequency: Monthly
- Founded: 1941
- Final issue: 2015
- Country: Yugoslavia; Slovenia
- Based in: Titograd; Ljubljana
- Language: Slovene

Naša žena (Slovene: Our Woman) was a monthly women's magazine based in Ljubljana, Slovenia. The magazine was the first publication addressing women in the Yugoslav Republic of Slovenia which was in circulation between 1941 and 2015.

== History and profile ==
Naša žena was established in 1941 as a newsletter of the Women's Antifascist Front of Montenegro and Boka (WAF). It was edited by the members of the WAF Central Committee. It became a clandestine publication in the period of World War II, and Mara Rupena Osolnik began to serve as its editor-in-chief in 1943. Following the end of the war it was published by the state agencies on a monthly basis. The magazine was based in Titograd (now Podgorica in Montenegro) in the 1960s.

One of its initial goals was to reinforce the socialist struggle for women's equality and to publish articles on female employment and their family life. During the communist era Naša žena reinforced the state ideology of socialist women who should be both modern and economically productive. Therefore, it supported a model of women as a working mother and a wife. The magazine presented tips for them in regard to the fulfillment of these roles all at once. It encouraged similar role models for women in the 1990s. The magazine also serialized literary work, including John Steinbeck's Tortilla Flat in 1979.

From its start to late 1980s Naša žena was the most influential publication targeting both families and rural and urban women in Slovenia. In a 1969 study it was concluded that 33.3% of Slovenians who read print media were the readers of the magazine.

Naša žena folded in 2015.
