= List of works by Jože Plečnik =

This is a list of works by the Slovenian architect Jože Plečnik (1872–1957), who practised in Vienna, Belgrade, Prague and Ljubljana.

- Langer House, Vienna, 13th district (1900–1901)
- Steggasse Tenement House, Vienna, 5th district (1902)
- Zacherlhaus, Vienna, 1st district (1903–1905)
- St Charles Borromeo Fountain (Karl-Borromäus-Brunnen), Vienna, 3rd district (1906-1909)
- Church of the Holy Spirit, Vienna, 16th district (1908–1913)
- Prague Castle (various projects), Prague (1920–1934)
- Prague Castle (Garden of Eden and first court), Prague (1920–1926)
- Church of the Most Sacred Heart of Our Lord, Prague (1928–1932)
- Bežigrad Stadium, Ljubljana (1923–1939)
- Church of St. Francis of Assisi, Šiška, Ljubljana (1925–1927)
- Chamber of commerce, work and industry, Ljubljana (1925–1927)
- Church of St. Michael (Sveti Mihael na Barju), Črna Vas near Ljubljana (1937–1939)
- The Bank of Celje building, Celje (1927–1930)
- Church of St. Anthony of Padua Red Cross, Belgrade (1928–1932)
- The Vzajemna zavarovalnica insurance company building, Ljubljana (1928–1939)
- "Tromostovje" or the Triple bridge, Ljubljana (1929–1932)
- National and University Library, Ljubljana (1930–1941)
- Cobblers' Bridge (Čevljarski or, more accurately, Šuštarski most), Ljubljana (1931–1932)
- Peglezen, the "Flatiron" house, Ljubljana (1932–1934)
- Žale Cemetery, Ljubljana (1937–1940)
- The Fish Market, Ljubljana (1939–1942)
- The Ursuline gymnasium, Ljubljana, (1939–1940)
- Slovene National Parliament, (Katedrala svobode) Ljubljana (1947) (unrealized)
- Križanke, Ljubljana (1952–1956)
- Church of the Visitation in Ponikve (1952–1958)
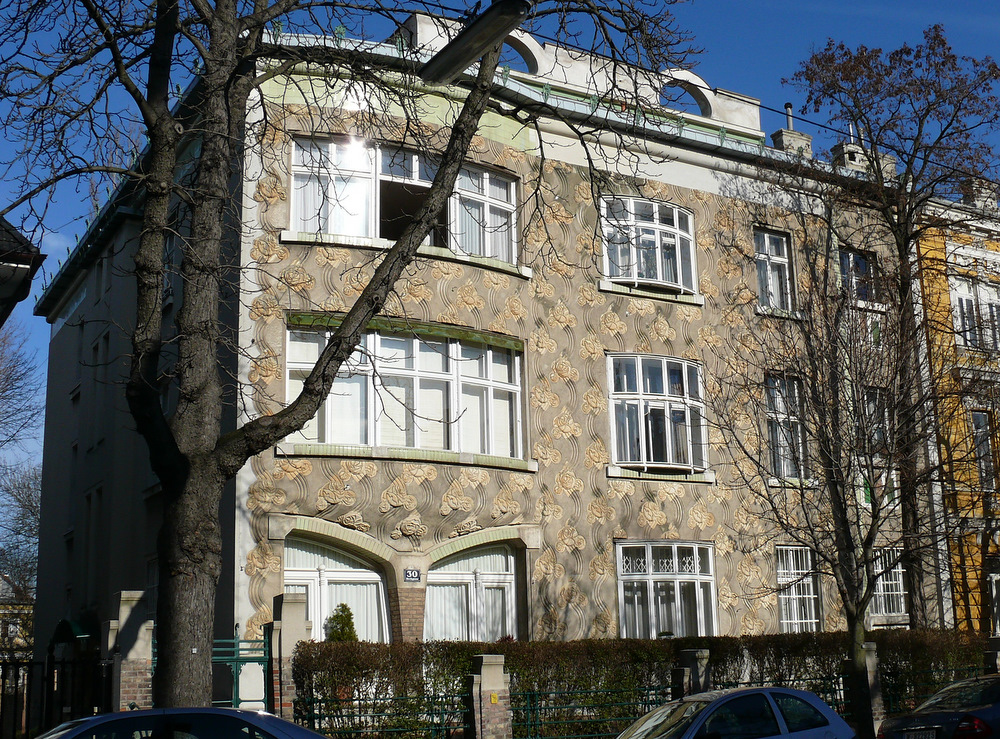
Langer House, Vienna, (1900–01)

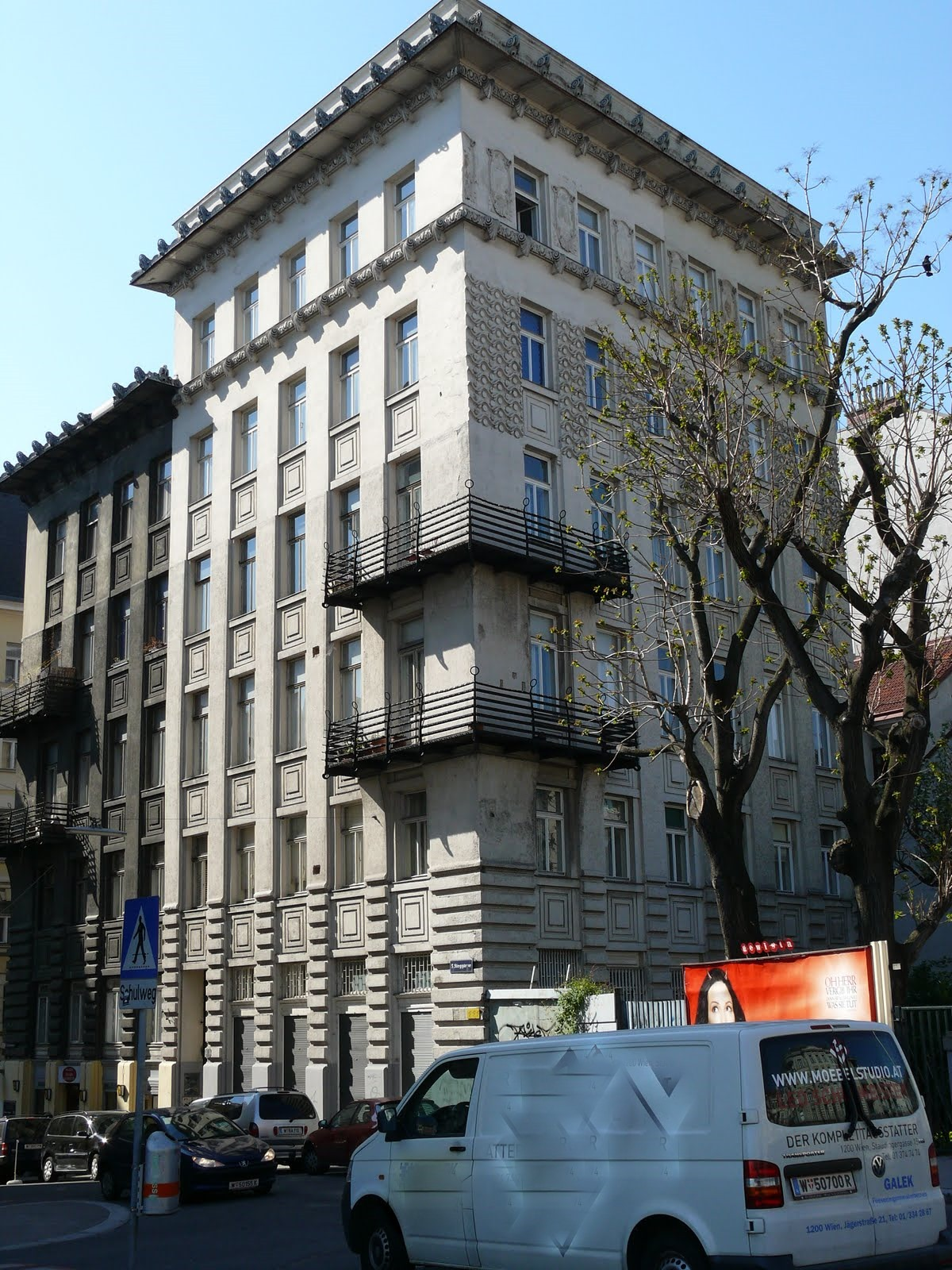
Steggasse Tenement House, Vienna, (1902)

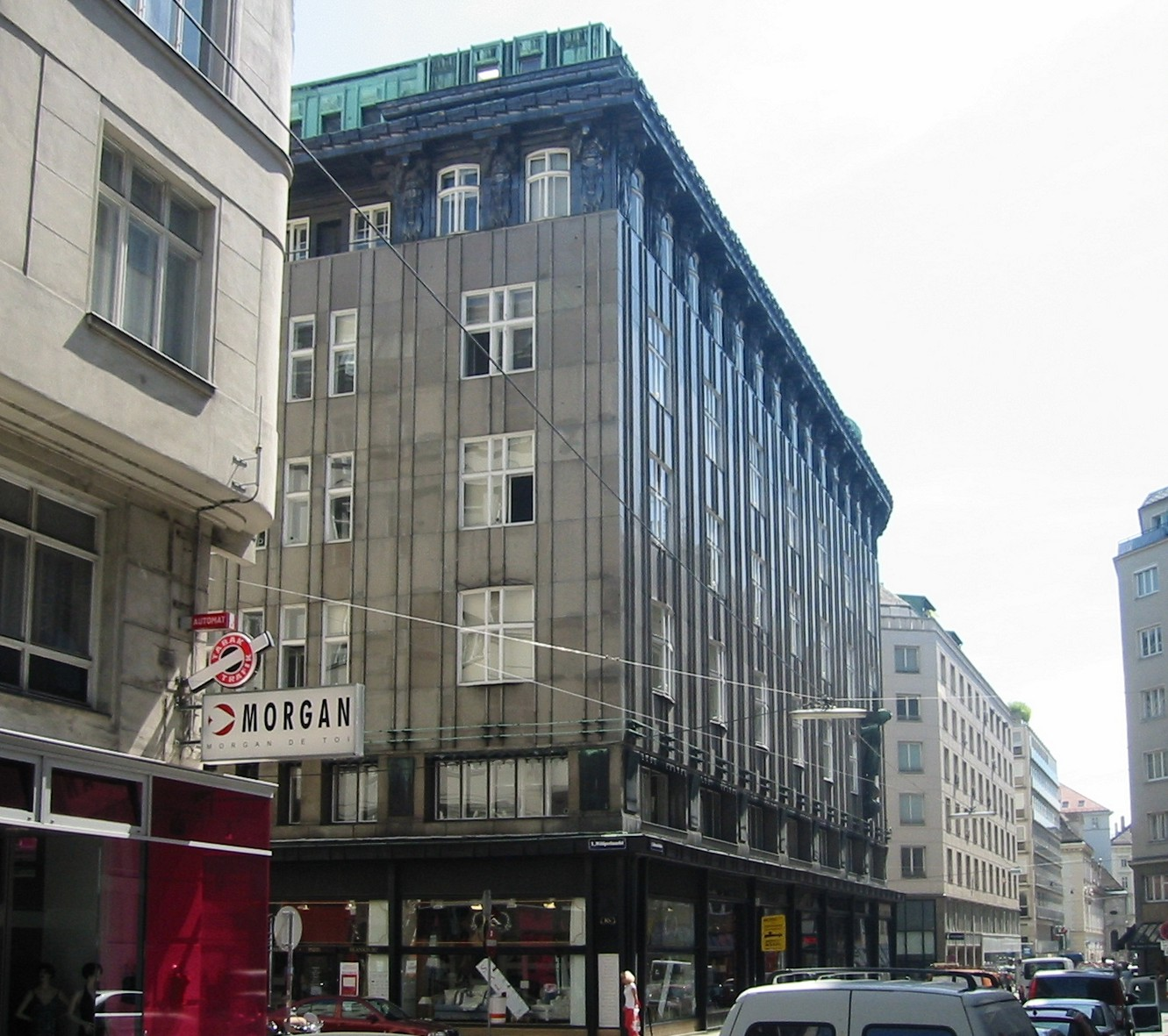
Zacherlhaus, Vienna, (1903–05)

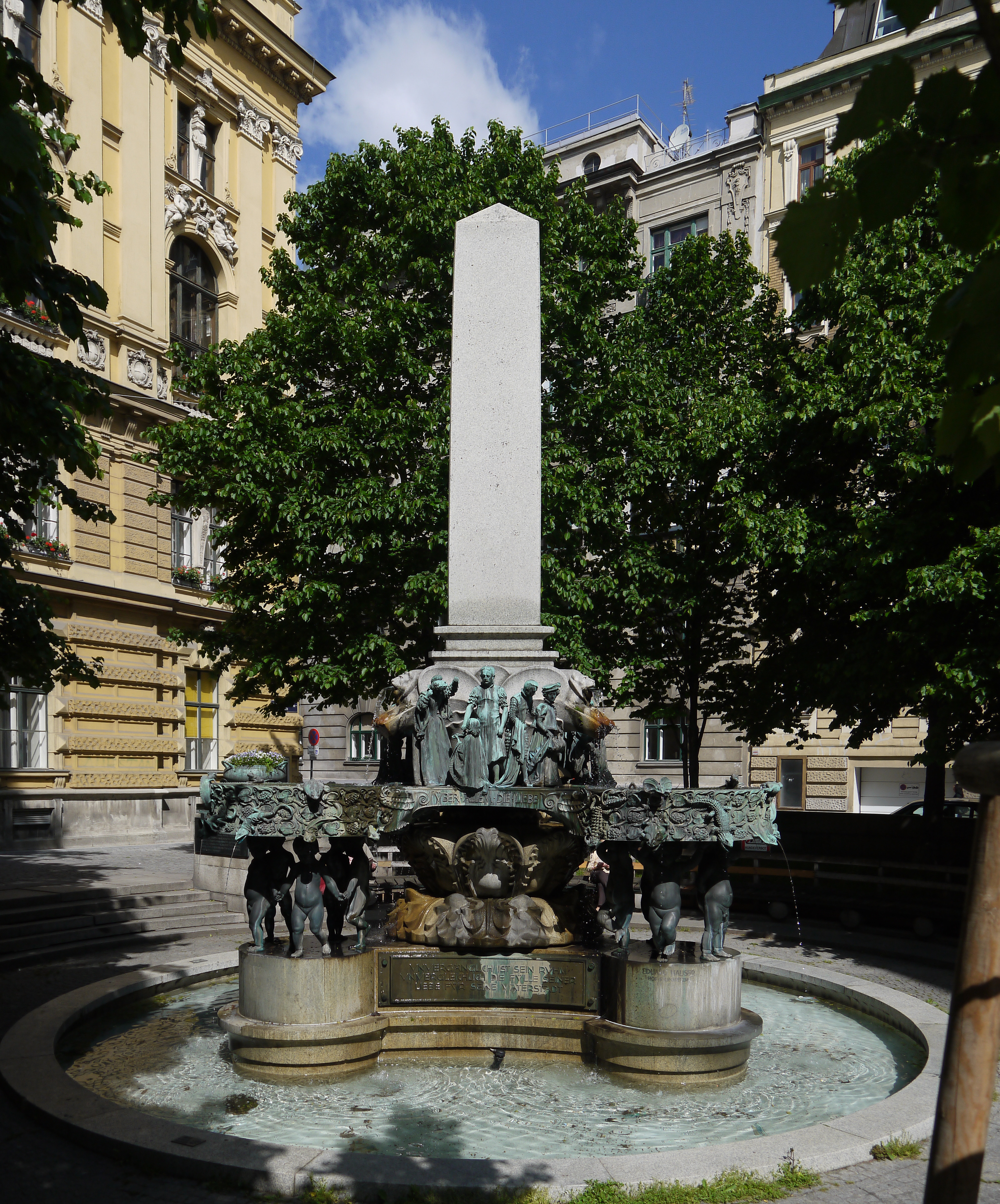
St Charles Borromeo Fountain (Karl-Borromäus-Brunnen), Vienna (1906-1909)

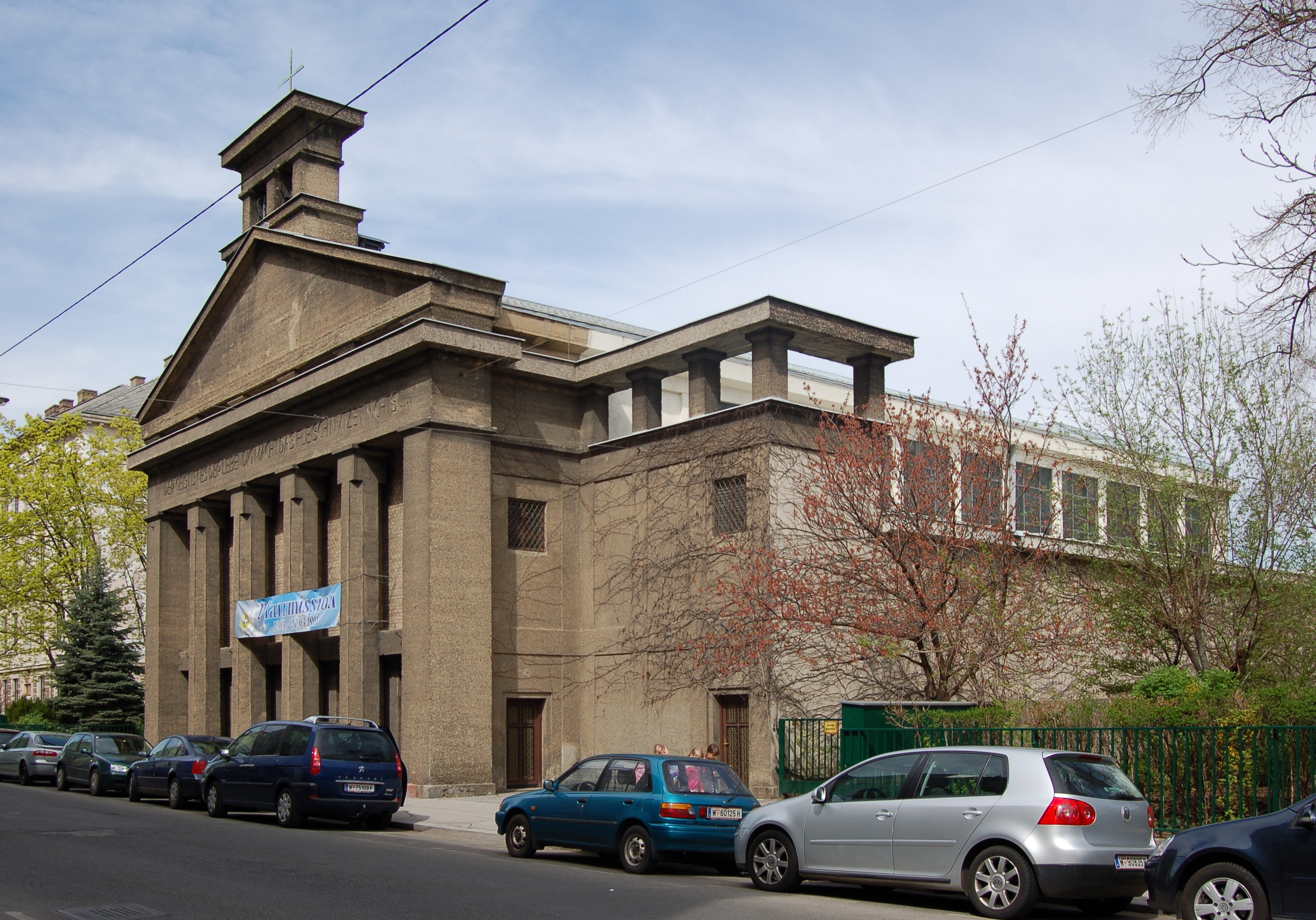
Church of the Holy Spirit, Vienna, (1913)

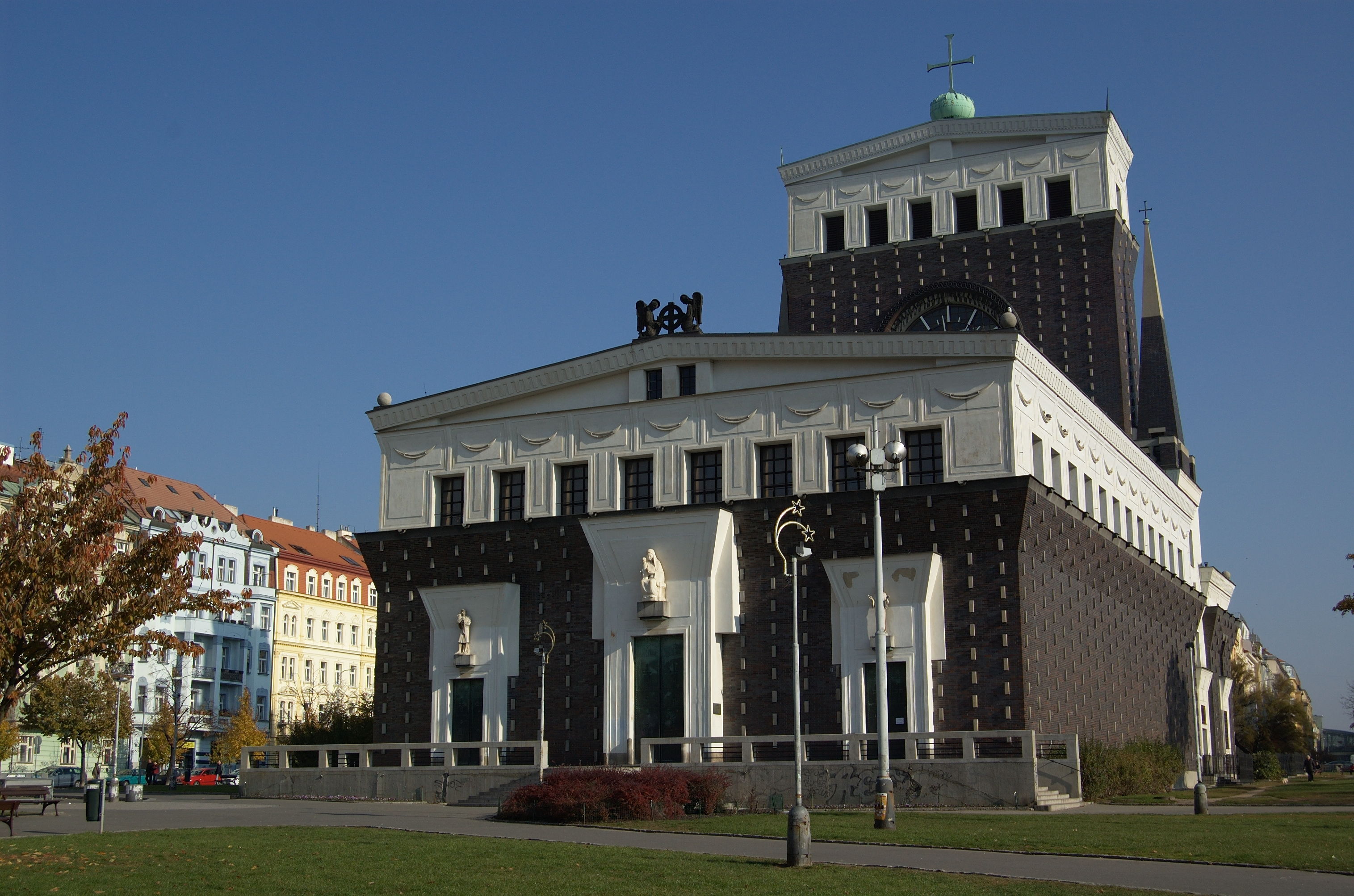
Church of the Sacred Heart of Jesus, Prague, (1921–32)

"Tromostovje" or the Triple bridge, Ljubljana, (1929–32)

National and University Library, Ljubljana, (1930–41)
