= List of World Heritage Sites in Southern Europe =

The UNESCO (United Nations Educational, Scientific and Cultural Organization) has designated 175 World Heritage Sites in all of the 15 sovereign countries (also called "state parties") of Southern Europe: Albania, Andorra, Bosnia and Herzegovina, Croatia, Greece, Italy, Malta, Montenegro, North Macedonia, Portugal, San Marino, Serbia, Slovenia, Spain, and Vatican City as well as one site in the British Overseas Territory of Gibraltar. While Turkey has territory in Southern Europe, they are not included here but in Western Asia, and Cyprus is also included in Western Asia.

The top two countries by number of World Heritage Sites are located in this region: Italy with 58 sites and Spain with 49 sites (44 sites not including those on the Canary Islands, which are included in Africa). Seven sites are shared between several countries: Prehistoric Rock Art Sites in the Côa Valley and Siega Verde (Portugal and Spain), Rhaetian Railway in the Albula / Bernina Landscapes (Italy and Switzerland), Monte San Giorgio (Italy and Switzerland), Historic Centre of Rome, the Properties of the Holy See in that City Enjoying Extraterritorial Rights and San Paolo Fuori le Mura (Holy See and Italy), Pyrénées – Mont Perdu (France and Spain), Prehistoric Pile dwellings around the Alps (Austria, France, Germany, Italy, Slovenia and Switzerland) and Heritage of Mercury – Almadén and Idrija (Slovenia and Spain). The first sites from the region were inscribed in 1979 a year after the list's conception, and included six sites in the former Yugoslavia and one site in Italy. Each year, UNESCO's World Heritage Committee may inscribe new sites on the list, or delist sites that no longer meet the criteria. Selection is based on ten criteria: six for cultural heritage (i–vi) and four for natural heritage (vii–x). Some sites, designated "mixed sites," represent both cultural and natural heritage. In Southern Europe, there are 154 cultural, 16 natural, and 5 mixed sites.

The World Heritage Committee may also specify that a site is endangered, citing "conditions which threaten the very characteristics for which a property was inscribed on the World Heritage List." One of the sites (Medieval Monuments in Kosovo) in Southern Europe is listed as endangered and four sites (Old City of Dubrovnik, Natural and Culturo-Historical Region of Kotor, Plitvice Lakes National Park and Butrint) were previously listed. Possible danger listing has been considered by UNESCO in a number of other cases.

== Legend ==
Site; named after the World Heritage Committee's official designation
Location; at city, regional, or provincial level and geocoordinates
Criteria; as defined by the World Heritage Committee
Area; in hectares and acres. If available, the size of the buffer zone has been noted as well. A value of zero implies that no data has been published by UNESCO
Year; during which the site was inscribed to the World Heritage List
Description; brief information about the site, including reasons for qualifying as an endangered site, if applicable

== World Heritage Sites ==
* Trans-border site
† In danger

Site	Image	Location	Criteria	Area ha (acre)	Year	Description
18th-Century Royal Palace at Caserta with the Park, the Aqueduct of Vanvitelli, and the San Leucio Complex	A row of water basins leading to a large palace building.	Provinces of Caserta and Benevento, Campania, Italy; 41°4′24″N 14°19′35″E	Cultural: (i)(ii)(iii)(iv)	87 (210); buffer zone 111 (270)	1997	
Acropolis, Athens	Ruins of a white temple with columns on a rock above a city.	Attica, Greece; 37°58′15″N 23°43′34″E	Cultural: (i)(ii)(iii)(iv)(vi)	3.04 (7.5); buffer zone 117 (290)	1987	A collection of massive, yet perfectly balanced architectural masterpieces in harmony with the natural landscape, the Acropolis of Athens is one of the most important expressions of Classical Greek aesthetics. It was completed by the 5th century BC and has since then exerted a profound influence on architecture worldwide.
Alhambra, Generalife and Albayzín, Granada	A courtyard with a gallery and a basin supported by lion sculptures.	Province of Granada, Andalusia, Spain; 37°10′36″N 3°35′40″W	Cultural: (i)(iii)(iv)	—	1984 (Note: Extended in 1994 to include the Albayzin neighborhood and name change from Alhambra and the Generalife, Granada to the present name.)	The three sites are remnants of the Moorish influence in southern Spain. The fortress Alhambra and the palace Generalife were built by the rulers of the Emirate of Granada. The Albayzín district contains examples of the Moorish vernacular architecture and was added to the listing in 1994.
Alto Douro Wine Region	A river with terraced vineyards.	Douro Subregion, Trás-os-Montes e Alto Douro Province, Portugal; 41°6′6″N 7°47′56″W	Cultural: (iii)(iv)(v)	24,600 (61,000); buffer zone 225,400 (557,000)	2001	
Ancient and Primeval Beech Forests of the Carpathians and Other Regions of Europe		Albania*; Austria*; Belgium*; Bulgaria*; Croatia*; Mecklenburg-Vorpommern, Brandenburg, Thuringia, Hesse, Germany*; Italy*; Romania*; Prešov Region, Slovakia*; Slovenia*; Spain*; Zakarpattia Oblast, Ukraine* 49°5′10″N 22°32′10″E	Natural: (ix)	92,023 (227,390); buffer zone 253,815 (627,190)	2007 (Note: Extended in 2011 to include the Ancient Beech Forests of Germany and name change from Primeval Beech Forests of the Carpathians to the present name. Extended again in 2017 to include additional sites in other countries.)	Primeval Beech Forests of the Carpathians are used to study the spread of the beech tree (Fagus sylvatica) in the Northern Hemisphere across a variety of environments and the environment in the forest. The addition of the Ancient Beech Forests of Germany in 2011 included five forests totaling 4,391 hectares (10,850 acres) that are added to the 29,278 hectares (72,350 acres) of Slovakian and Ukrainian beech forests inscribed on the World Heritage List in 2007. The site was further expanded in 2017 to include forests in 9 additional European countries.
Antequera Dolmens Site		Antequera, Province of Málaga, Andalusia, Spain; 37°1′30″N 4°32′40″W	Cultural: (i)(iii)(iv)	2,446 (6,040); buffer zone 10,788 (26,660)	2016	
Arab–Norman Palermo and the Cathedral Churches of Cefalú and Monreale		Province of Palermo, Sicily, Italy; 38°6′39″N 13°21′11″E	Cultural: (ii)(iv)	6.24 (15.4); buffer zone 483 (1,190)	2015	The new Norman rulers started to build various constructions in what is called the Arab-Norman style. They incorporated the best practices of Arab and Byzantine architecture into their own art.
Aranjuez Cultural Landscape	A large palace building with white and orange walls.	Aranjuez, Community of Madrid, Spain; 40°2′11″N 3°36′34″W	Cultural: (ii)(iv)	2,048 (5,060); buffer zone 16,605 (41,030)	2001	The landscape around the Royal Palace of Aranjuez was developed by the Spanish royal family over a course of three centuries and contains innovative horticultural and design ideas. The area was the exclusive property of the royal family until the 19th century when the modern civilian city developed.
Archaeological Area and the Patriarchal Basilica of Aquileia	Roman stone church.	Province of Udine, Friuli-Venezia Giulia, Italy; 45°46′6″N 13°22′3″E	Cultural: (iii)(iv)(vi)	155 (380)	1998	
Archaeological Area of Agrigento	Ruins of a classical temple with columns.	Province of Agrigento, Sicily, Italy; 37°17′23″N 13°35′36″E	Cultural: (i)(ii)(iii)(iv)	934 (2,310); buffer zone 1,869 (4,620)	1997	
Archaeological Areas of Pompei, Herculaneum and Torre Annunziata	A street with ruined houses.	Province of Naples, Campania, Italy; 40°45′0″N 14°29′0″E	Cultural: (iii)(iv)(v)	98 (240); buffer zone 24 (59)	1997	
Archaeological Ensemble of Tárraco	Ruins of an amphitheatre near the sea.	Province of Tarragona, Catalonia, Spain; 41°6′53″N 1°15′34″E	Cultural: (ii)(iii)	100 (250)	2000	The prominent Roman city of Tárraco at the site of modern-day Tarragona served as the capital of the provinces of Hispania Citerior and later Hispania Tarraconensis. The amphitheatre was constructed in the 2nd century. Most remains are only fragments or preserved under more modern buildings.
Archaeological Ensemble of Mérida	Ruins of an amphitheatre near the sea.	Province of Badajoz, Extremadura, Spain; 38°54′58″N 6°20′16″W	Cultural: (iii)(iv)	—	1993	Mérida was founded in 25 BC by the Romans as Emerita Augusta and was the capital of the Lusitania province. Remains from the Roman era include a bridge, aqueduct, amphitheatre, theatre, circus, and forum.
Archaeological Site of Aigai (modern name Vergina)	Facade of an underground structure with a painting above the door.	Imathia, Central Macedonia, Greece; 40°28′17″N 22°19′6″E	Cultural: (i)(iii)	1,421 (3,510); buffer zone 4,812 (11,890)	1996	The ancient city of Aigai was the first capital of the Kingdom of Macedon. In addition to the monumental palace, lavishly decorated with mosaics and painted stuccoes, the site contains a burial ground with more than 300 tumuli, one of which has been identified as that of Philip II of Macedon, father of Alexander the Great.
Archaeological Site of Atapuerca	Archaeological excavation site in red earth.	Province of Burgos, Castile and León, Spain; 42°22′17″N 3°32′50″W	Cultural: (iii)(v)	—	2000	The caves in the Atapuerca Mountains contain fossil remains of the earliest human beings discovered in Europe dating from nearly one million years ago. The Sima de los Huesos or "Pit of Bones" contains the world's largest collection of hominid fossils.
Archaeological Site of Delphi	Ruins of an amphitheatre in a mountain landscape.	Phocis, Central Greece, Greece; 38°28′53″N 22°29′46″E	Cultural: (i)(ii)(iii)(iv)(vi)	51 (130); buffer zone 14,314 (35,370)	1987	The pan-Hellenic sanctuary of Delphi, location of the oracle of Apollo, was the spiritual center of the Greek world. Situated in a spectacular natural setting at the foot of Mount Parnassus, it was a symbol of Greek cultural unity from the 8th century BC onwards.
Archaeological Site of Mystras	A complex of buildings partially in ruins in a mountain landscape.	Laconia, Peloponnese, Greece; 37°4′50″N 22°22′0″E	Cultural: (ii)(iii)(iv)	54 (130); buffer zone 1,203 (2,970)	1989	Long known as "the Wonder of the Morea", the remarkably well-preserved medieval city of Mystras played a central role in the final years of the Byzantine Empire. Built on a steep hill at the foot of Mount Taygetus, it was the last Byzantine stronghold to fall to the Ottomans, holding out until 1461.
Archaeological Site of Olympia	Ruins of buildings and a column.	Elis, Western Peloponnese, Greece; 37°39′0″N 21°40′0″E	Cultural: (i)(ii)(iii)(iv)(vi)	106 (260); buffer zone 1,458 (3,600)	1989	The site of Olympia, built on the banks of the Alpheios river in the Peloponnese, was the location of the ancient Olympic Games beginning in 776 BC. In addition to numerous temples and sanctuaries, it contains the remains of several sporting structures, such as its famous stadium.
Archaeological Sites of Mycenae and Tiryns	A gate of stone with a relief of two four legged animals.	Argolis, Peloponnese, Greece; 37°44′0″N 22°45′0″E	Cultural: (i)(ii)(iii)(iv)(vi)	—	1999	Mycenae and Tiryns were two of the most important cities of Mycenean Greece, which flourished between the 15th and 12th centuries BC. The Lion's Gate and Treasury of Atreus at Mycenae have been listed as "outstanding examples of human creative genius".
Archaeological Site of Philippi		Kavala, Eastern Macedonia and Thrace, Greece; 41°00′47″N 24°17′11″E	Cultural: (iii)(iv)	88 (220); buffer zone 176 (430)	2016	
Assisi, the Basilica of San Francesco and Other Franciscan Sites	A white church with a white tower next to it.	Italy; 43°3′58″N 12°37′21″E	Cultural: (i)(ii)(iii)(iv)(vi)	14,563 (35,990); buffer zone 4,087 (10,100)	2000	
Botanical Garden (Orto Botanico), Padua	A garden with a church in the background.	City and Province of Padua, Veneto, Italy; 45°23′57″N 11°52′50″E	Cultural: (ii)(iii)	2.20 (5.4); buffer zone 11 (27)	1997	
Burgos Cathedral	White gothic style cathedral.	Burgos, Province of Burgos, Castile and León, Spain; 42°20′25″N 3°42′14.5″W	Cultural: (ii)(iv)(vi)	—	1984	The Gothic-style cathedral was constructed between the 13th and 16th centuries. It is the burial place of Spanish national hero, El Cid.
Butrint	Ruins of an amphitheatre and other structures.	Sarandë District, Albania; 39°45′4″N 20°1′34″E	Cultural: (iii)	3,980 (9,800); buffer zone 4,611 (11,390)	1992 (Note: Extended in 1999 by a small coastal area in order to prevent tourism developments and minor modification in 2007 declaring the Butrint National Park as buffer zone.)	The site had been listed as endangered 1997–2005 following damages due to management and conservation.
Castel del Monte	Octagonal castle with a tower on each of the eight corners.	Andria and Corato, Province of Bari, Apulia, Italy; 41°5′5″N 16°16′15″E	Cultural: (i)(ii)(iii)	3.10 (7.7); buffer zone 10,847 (26,800)	1996	
Catalan Romanesque Churches of the Vall de Boí	Stone church with a separate massive tower.	Province of Lleida, Catalonia, Spain; 42°30′17″N 0°48′13″E	Cultural: (ii)(iv)	—	2000	The small valley at the edge of the Pyrenees contains churches in Romanesque style decorated with Romanesque murals, statues, and altars. The churches are unique for their tall, square bell towers.
Cathedral, Alcázar and Archivo de Indias in Seville	Cityscape with a large church and another large building.	Province of Seville, Andalusia, Spain; 37°23′2″N 5°59′30″W	Cultural: (i)(ii)(iii)(vi)	12 (30); buffer zone 187 (460)	1987 (Note: Minor boundary modification in 2010.)	The Alcázar was built during the Almohad dynasty that ruled southern Spain until the Reconquista. The cathedral dates to the 15th century and holds the tombs of Ferdinand III and Christopher Columbus. The Archivo (Archive) houses documents relating to the colonization of the Americas.
Cathedral, Torre Civica and Piazza Grande, Modena	A white stone church with one tall tower.	City and Province of Modena, Emilia-Romagna, Italy; 44°38′46″N 10°55′32″E	Cultural: (i)(ii)(iii)(iv)	1.20 (3.0); buffer zone 1.10 (2.7)	1997	
Cave of Altamira and Paleolithic Cave Art of Northern Spain	Rock painting of a bison in red and black.	Santillana del Mar, Cantabria, Spain; 43°22′57″N 4°6′58″W	Cultural: (i)(iii)	2,235 (5,520)	1985 (Note: Extended in 2008 to include the Palaeolithic cave art of Northern Spain and name change from Altamira Cave to the present name.)	The Cave of Altamira contains examples of cave painting from the Upper Paleolithic period, ranging from 35,000 to 11,000 BC. The original listing contained seventeen decorated caves. The caves are well-preserved because of their deep isolation from the external climate.
Central Zone of the Town of Angra do Heroismo in the Azores	Coastal town with white houses and churches with red roofs.	Terceira Island, Azores, Portugal; 38°39′18″N 27°13′12″W	Cultural: (iv)(vi)	—	1983	
Church and Dominican Convent of Santa Maria delle Grazie with "The Last Supper" by Leonardo da Vinci	Painting of the last supper.	Province of Milano, Lombardy, Italy; 45°27′57″N 9°10′14″E	Cultural: (i)(ii)	1.50 (3.7)	1980	
Cilento and Vallo di Diano National Park with the Archeological sites of Paestum and Velia, and the Certosa di Padula	Ruins of a temple with columns.	Province of Salerno, Campania, Italy; 40°17′0″N 15°16′0″E	Cultural: (iii)(iv)	159,110 (393,200); buffer zone 178,101 (440,100)	1998	
City of Valletta	Coastal city with churches and a large dome.	Malta Island, Malta; 35°54′2″N 14°30′52″E	Cultural: (i)(vi)	56 (140)	1980	
City of Verona	A city with a small square and a tower.	City and Province of Verona, Veneto, Italy; 45°26′19″N 10°59′38″E	Cultural: (ii)(iv)	453 (1,120); buffer zone 431 (1,070)	2000	
City of Vicenza and the Palladian Villas of the Veneto	A three storied villa.	Provinces of Padua, Rovigo, Treviso, Venice, Verona and Vicenza, Veneto, Italy; 45°32′57″N 11°32′58″E	Cultural: (i)(ii)	334 (830)	1994 (Note: Extended in 1996 to include sites outside of the vicinity of Vicenza and name change from Vicenza, City of Palladio to the present name.)	
Convent of Christ in Tomar	Christian religious building with a bell.	Tomar, Santarém District, Portugal; 39°36′17″N 8°25′3″W	Cultural: (i)(vi)	—	1983	
Costiera Amalfitana	Mountainous coastline.	Province of Salerno, Campania, Italy; 40°39′0″N 14°36′0″E	Cultural: (ii)(iv)(v)	11,231 (27,750)	1997	
Crespi d'Adda	A row of parallel and connected factory buildings.	Province of Bergamo, Lombardy, Italy; 45°35′36″N 9°32′18″E	Cultural: (iv)(v)	—	1995	
Cultural Landscape of Sintra	Entrance bridge and gateway of Pena Palace.	Sintra, Portugal; 38°47′0″N 9°25′0″W	Cultural: (ii)(iv)(v)	946 (2,340); buffer zone 3,641 (9,000)	1995	
Cultural Landscape of the Serra de Tramuntana	A mountain village with a church.	Mallorca, Spain; 39°43′51″N 2°41′41″E	Cultural: (ii)(iv)(v)	30,745 (75,970); buffer zone 78,617 (194,270)	2011	
Delos	A row of white lion sculptures on pedestals.	Cyclades, South Aegean, Greece; 37°24′0″N 25°16′0″E	Cultural: (ii)(iii)(iv)(vi)	351 (870)	1990	The birthplace of Apollo and Artemis according to Greek mythology, the sacred island of Delos was one of the most important pan-Hellenic sanctuaries. The sanctuary of Apollo on Delos attracted pilgrims from all over Greece, making Delos a prosperous trading port.
Doñana National Park	Wetlands with birds.	Huelva and Seville Provinces, Andalusia, Spain; 36°56′52″N 6°21′32″W	Natural: (vii)(ix)(x)	54,252 (134,060)	1994 (Note: Extended in 2005 to bring the property in line with the extended National Park.)	The park consists of the delta region where the Guadalquivir River reaches the Atlantic Ocean. It is home to a diverse variety of biotopes, such as lagoons, marshlands, dunes, and maquis. The park is one of the largest heronries in the Mediterranean region and holds more than 500,000 water fowl during the winter period.
Durmitor National Park	Fog in a mountain landscape with white rocks.	Montenegro; 43°7′59″N 19°1′0″E	Natural: (vii)(viii)(x)	32,100 (79,000)	1980 (Note: Minor modification of boundaries in 2005 to bring it in line with those of the state National Park.)	
Early Christian Monuments of Ravenna	Mosaic showing a man with a crown.	City and Province of Ravenna, Emilia-Romagna, Italy; 44°25′14″N 12°11′47″E	Cultural: (i)(ii)(iii)(iv)	1.32 (3.3)	1996	
Episcopal Complex of the Euphrasian Basilica in the Historic Centre of Poreč	Small courtyard of a church with Christian paintings on the outside of the upper floor.	Poreč, Istria County, Croatia; 45°13′45″N 13°35′40″E	Cultural: (ii)(iii)(iv)	1.10 (2.7)	1997	The episcopal complex, with its striking mosaics dating back to the 6th century, is one of the best examples of early Byzantine art and architecture in the Mediterranean region and the world. It includes the basilica itself, a sacristy, a baptistery and the bell tower of the nearby archbishop's palace.
Etruscan Necropolises of Cerveteri and Tarquinia	Grass-covered conical structures.	Provinces of Rome and Viterbo, Lazio, Italy; 42°0′25″N 12°6′7″E	Cultural: (i)(iii)(iv)	21 (52); buffer zone 5,786 (14,300)	2004	
Evaporitic Karst and Caves of Northern Apennines		Emilia-Romagna, Italy; 44°22′47.8″N 10°23′20.1″E	Natural: (viii)	3,680 (9,100); buffer zone 8,348 (20,630)	2023	
Ferrara, City of the Renaissance, and its Po Delta	Sunset over a river.	City and Province of Ferrara, Emilia-Romagna, Italy; 44°50′16″N 11°37′10″E	Cultural: (ii)(iii)(iv)(v)(vi)	46,712 (115,430); buffer zone 117,649 (290,720)	1995 (Note: Extended in 1999 to include the Po Delta and name change from Ferrara, city of the Renaissance to the present name.)	
Funerary Tradition in the Prehistory of Sardinia – The domus de janas		Sardinia, Italy; 40°5′6″N 8°57′3.6″E	Cultural: (iii)	156 (390); buffer zone 14,655 (36,210)	2025	
Garrison Border Town of Elvas and its Fortifications	Ramparts of Elvas.	Alentejo, Portugal; 38°52′50″N 7°9′48″W	Cultural: (iv)	179 (440); buffer zone 608 (1,500)	2012	The site, extensively fortified from the 17th to 19th centuries, represents the largest bulwarked dry ditch system in the work. Within its walls, the town contains barracks and other military buildings as well as churches and monasteries. While Elvas contains remains dating back to the 10th century A.D., its fortification began when Portugal regained independence in 1640. The fortifications designed by Dutch Jesuit Padre João Piscásio Cosmander represent the best surviving example of the Dutch school of fortifications anywhere. The site also contains the Amoreira Aqueduct, built to enable the stronghold to withstand lengthy sieges.
Gamzigrad-Romuliana, Palace of Galerius	Ruins of a building with columns.	Zaječar, Serbia; 43°53′57.5″N 22°11′10″E	Cultural: (iii)(iv)	179 (440); buffer zone 545 (1,350)	2007	The Late Roman fortified palace compound and memorial complex of Gamzigrad-Romuliana, Palace of Galerius, in the east of Serbia, was commissioned by Emperor Caius Valerius Galerius Maximianus, in the late 3rd and early 4th centuries. It was known as Felix Romuliana, named after the emperor's mother. The site consists of fortifications, the palace in the north-western part of the complex, basilicas, temples, hot baths, memorial complex, and a tetrapylon. The group of buildings is also unique in its intertwining of ceremonial and memorial functions.
Genoa: Le Strade Nuove and the system of the Palazzi dei Rolli	Narrow street lined by four storied buildings.	Province of Genoa, Liguria, Italy; 44°24′44″N 8°55′52″E	Cultural: (ii)(iv)	16 (40); buffer zone 113 (280)	2006	
Gorham's Cave Complex		Gibraltar, UK; 36.120397°N 5.342075°W	Cultural: (iii)	—	2016	A natural sea cave, considered to be one of the last known habitations of the Neanderthals in Europe.
Ħal Saflieni Hypogeum	Underground structure.	Paola, Malta Island, Malta; 35°52′17″N 14°30′27″E	Cultural: (iii)	—	1980	
Heritage of Mercury. Almadén and Idrija	Almadén mine.	Slovenia*; Spain* 38°46′31″N 4°50′20″W	Cultural: (ii)(iv)	104 (260)	2012	
Historical Complex of Split with the Palace of Diocletian	A grey palace building with columns.	Split-Dalmatia County, Croatia; 43°30′34″N 16°26′36″E	Cultural: (ii)(iii)(iv)	21 (52)	1979	The palace was built by the Roman emperor Diocletian at the turn of the fourth century AD, and later served as the basis of the city of Split. A cathedral was built in the Middle Ages inside the ancient mausoleum, along with churches, fortifications, Gothic and Renaissance palaces. The Baroque style makes up the rest of the area.
Historic Centre of Cordoba	Dense city centre with white houses and a large church or palace complex.	Province of Córdoba, Andalusia, Spain; 37°52′45″N 4°46′47″W	Cultural: (i)(ii)(iii)(iv)	—	1984 (Note: Extended in 1994 to include the surroundings of the Cathedral–Mosque of Córdoba and name change from Mosque of Cordoba to the present name.)	The original listing was the Great Mosque of Córdoba, a 7th-century mosque converted to a Roman Catholic cathedral in the 13th century by Ferdinand III. During the high period of the Moorish rule of the region, Córdoba had over 300 mosques and architecture that compared to that of Constantinople, Damascus, and Baghdad.
Historic Centre of Évora	Ruins of a classical columned temple.	Évora Municipality, Alentejo, Portugal; 38°24′23″N 7°54′28″W	Cultural: (ii)(iv)	—	1986	
Historic Centre of Florence	Bridge across a river with buildings on it.	City and Province of Florence, Tuscany, Italy; 43°46′23″N 11°15′22″E	Cultural: (i)(ii)(iii)(iv)(vi)	505 (1,250)	1982	
Historic Centre of Guimarães	A square palace complex with white walls and many chimneys.	Braga District, Minho Province, Portugal; 41°26′27″N 8°17′41″W	Cultural: (ii)(iii)(iv)	16 (40); buffer zone 45 (110)	2001	
Historic Centre of Naples	Narrow street with five-storied buildings.	City and Province of Naples, Campania, Italy; 40°51′5″N 14°15′46″E	Cultural: (ii)(iv)	—	1995	
Historic Centre of Oporto, Luiz I Bridge and Monastery of Serra do Pilar	Metal bridge across a river and city centre built on a hillside.	Norte, Portugal; 41°8′30″N 8°37′0″W	Cultural: (iv)	—	1996	
Historic Centre of Rome, the Properties of the Holy See in that City Enjoying Extraterritorial Rights and San Paolo Fuori le Mura	Building with white columns in the lower floor and Christian paintings on the walls of the upper floor.	Holy See*; Rome, Lazio, Italy* 41°53′25″N 12°29′32″E	Cultural: (i)(ii)(iii)(iv)(vi)	1,485 (3,670)	1980 (Note: Extended in 1990 and name change from Historic Centre of Rome to the present name.)	
Historic Centre of San Gimignano	A small town dominated by many tall stone towers..	San Gimignano, Province of Siena, Tuscany, Italy; 43°28′5″N 11°2′30″E	Cultural: (i)(iii)(iv)	14 (35)	1990	
Historic Centre of Siena	A large square surrounded by multi-storied buildings. One of the buildings has a tall and narrow tower.	City and Province of Siena, Tuscany, Italy; 43°19′7″N 11°19′54″E	Cultural: (i)(ii)(iv)	170 (420); buffer zone 9,907 (24,480)	1995	
Historic Centre of the City of Pienza	Narrow street and three-storied houses.	Pienza, Province of Siena, Tuscany, Italy; 43°4′37″N 11°40′43″E	Cultural: (i)(ii)(iv)	4.41 (10.9)	1996	
Historic Centre of Urbino	A large palace in a city.	Province of Pesaro, Marche, Italy; 43°43′30″N 12°38′0″E	Cultural: (ii)(iv)	29 (72); buffer zone 3,609 (8,920)	1998	
Historic Centres of Berat and Gjirokastra	White houses with greyish roofs on a hillside.	Berat and Gjirokastër, Albania; 40°4′10″N 20°8′0″E	Cultural: (iii)(iv)	59 (150); buffer zone 136 (340)	2005 (Note: Extension of borders in 2008.)	
Historic City of Toledo	City with churches and other large structures on a hillside near a river.	Province of Toledo, Castile–La Mancha, Spain; 39°52′1″N 4°1′46″W	Cultural: (i)(ii)(vi)	—	1986	Toledo was founded by the Romans, served as the capital of the Visigothic Kingdom, was important in Muslim Spain and during the Reconquista, and briefly served as the capital of Spain. The city combines Christian, Muslim, and Jewish influences.
Historic City of Trogir	Coastal town with a palm tree promenade and houses with red roofs.	Split-Dalmatia County, Croatia; 43°30′45″N 16°15′6″E	Cultural: (ii)(v)	6.40 (15.8); buffer zone 4.80 (11.9)	1997	Trogir's rich culture was created under the influence of old Greeks, Romans, and Venetians. It is the best-preserved Romanesque-Gothic complex not only in the Adriatic, but in all of Central Europe. Trogir's medieval core, surrounded by walls, comprises a preserved castle and tower and a series of dwellings and palaces from the Romanesque, Gothic, Renaissance and Baroque periods.
Historic Walled Town of Cuenca	Town built on a rocky cliff.	Province of Cuenca, Castile–La Mancha, Spain; 40°4′36″N 2°7′54″W	Cultural: (ii)(v)	—	1996	The Moors built the fortified city in the early 8th century, and it was captured by the Christians in the 12th century. The cathedral is the first Gothic example in Spain. The town is also famous for its casas colgados, houses that hang over the edge of a cliff.
Ibiza, Biodiversity and Culture		Balearic Islands, Spain; 38°54′40″N 1°26′7″E	Mixed: (ii)(iii)(iv)(ix)(x)	8,564 (21,160)	1999	The coast of Ibiza is home to posidonia oceanica, a seagrass only found in the Mediterranean that supports a diverse coastal and marine ecosystem. The island also contains numerous Phoenician ruins, and the fortified and walled older portions of the city date to the 16th century.
Isole Eolie (Aeolian Islands)	A group of volcanic islands.	Southern Tyrrhenian Sea, Italy; 38°29′16″N 14°56′44″E	Natural: (viii)	1,216 (3,000)	2000	
Ivrea, Industrial City of the 20th Century	Panorama of Ivrea.	Ivrea, Italy; 45°28′0″N 7°53′0″E	Cultural: (iv)	71.185 (175.90); buffer zone 400.481 (989.61)	2018	
La Lonja de la Seda de Valencia	Interior of a building with high curled columns.	Valencia, Province of Valencia, Valencian Community, Spain; 39°28′28″N 0°22′42″W	Cultural: (i)(iv)	—	1996	La Lonja (or Llotja in Valencian language) de la Seda means Silk Exchange in English, and the group of Gothic buildings demonstrate the wealth of Valencia as an important Mediterranean and European mercantile city in the period.
Landscape of the Pico Island Vineyard Culture	Vineyards with low walls built of boulders and the sea in the distance.	Azores, Portugal; 38°30′48″N 28°32′28″W	Cultural: (iii)(v)	190 (470); buffer zone 2,445 (6,040)	2004	
Las Médulas	Landscape with red rocks.	Province of León, Castile and León, Spain; 42°28′10″N 6°46′15″W	Cultural: (i)(ii)(iii)(iv)	—	1997	The Romans established a gold mine and worked the site for two centuries. They used an early form of hydraulic mining and cut aqueducts in the rock cliffs to provide water for the operations. The Romans left in the early 3rd century, leaving sheer cliff faces and mining infrastructure that is intact today.
Late Baroque Towns of the Val di Noto (South-Eastern Sicily)	White baroque church.	Provinces of Catania, Ragusa and Syracuse, Sicily, Italy; 36°53′35.5″N 15°4′8″E	Cultural: (i)(ii)(iv)(v)	113 (280); buffer zone 306 (760)	2002	
Longobards in Italy. Places of the power (568-774 A.D.)	Basilica of San Salvatore in Brescia.	Italy; 46°5′39″N 13°25′59″E	Cultural: (ii)(iii)(vi)	14 (35); buffer zone 306 (760)	2011	The site includes seven Longobards towns: Brescia, Cividale del Friuli, Castelseprio, Spoleto, Campello sul Clitunno, Benevento and Monte Sant'Angelo.
Madriu-Perafita-Claror Valley	A small stone hut in the mountains.	Encamp, Andorra la Vella, Sant Julià de Lòria, Escaldes-Engordany, Andorra; 42°29′41″N 1°35′44″E	Cultural: (v)	—	2004 (Note: Minor extension of the buffer zone in 2006.)	
Mantua and Sabbioneta	Palace like building with a colonnade.	Italy; 45°9′34″N 10°47′40″E	Cultural: (ii)(iii)	235 (580); buffer zone 2,330 (5,800)	2008	
Medieval City of Rhodes	Fortresss at a harbour with sailing boats.	Rhodes, South Aegean, Greece; 36°26′50″N 28°13′40″E	Cultural: (ii)(iv)(v)	66 (160)	1988	The Order of St John of Jerusalem occupied Rhodes from 1309 to 1523 and set about transforming the city into a stronghold. It subsequently came under Turkish and Italian rule. With the Palace of the Grand Masters, the Great Hospital and the Street of the Knights, the Upper Town is one of the most beautiful urban ensembles of the Gothic period. In the Lower Town, Gothic architecture coexists with mosques, public baths and other buildings dating from the Ottoman period.
Medici Villas and Gardens in Tuscany		Tuscany, Italy; 43°51′28″N 11°18′15″E	Cultural: (ii)(iv)(vi)	125 (310); buffer zone 3,539 (8,750)	2013	
Medieval Monuments in Kosovo^{†}	Stone church with various towers.	Autonomous Province of Kosovo and Metohija, Serbia; 42°39′40″N 20°15′56″E	Cultural: (ii)(iii)(iv)	2.88 (7.1); buffer zone 115 (280)	2004 (Note: Extended in 2006 to include the Patriarchal Monastery of Peć, the Gračanica monastery and Our Lady of Ljeviš. Name change from Dečani Monastery to the present name.)	The four edifices of the site reflect the high points of the Byzantine-Romanesque ecclesiastical culture, with its distinct style of wall painting, which developed in the Balkans between the 13th and 17th centuries. The Dečani Monastery was built in the mid-14th century for the Serbian king Stefan Dečanski and is also his mausoleum. The Patriarchal Monastery of Peć is a group of four domed churches featuring series of wall paintings. The 13th-century frescoes of the Church of Holy Apostles are painted in a unique, monumental style. Early 14th-century frescoes in the church of the Holy Virgin of Ljevisa represent the appearance of the new so-called Palaiologian Renaissance style, combining the influences of the eastern Orthodox Byzantine and the Western Romanesque traditions. The style played a decisive role in subsequent Balkan art. The site has been listed as endangered since 2006 due to a lack of legal protection and management; political instability and security.
Medina Azahara, Córdoba	"Upper basilical hall" or "Dar al-Jund", perhaps for administration.	Province of Cordoba, Andalusia, Spain; 37°53′10″N 4°52′04″W	Cultural: (i)(iii)(iv)	—	2018	Ruins of a vast, fortified Arab Muslim medieval palace-city built by Abd-ar-Rahman III (912–961), the first Umayyad Caliph of Córdoba, and located on the western outskirts of Córdoba, Spain.
Megalithic Temples of Malta	Prehistoric stone structure with a geometric relief.	Gozo and Malta Island, Malta; 36°2′57″N 14°16′10″E	Cultural: (iv)	—	1980 (Note: Extended in 1992 to include the temples of Ħaġar Qim, Mnajdra, Ta' Ħaġrat, Skorba and Tarxien.)	
Mehmed Paša Sokolović Bridge in Višegrad	A bridge with many arcs across a river.	Republika Srpska, Bosnia and Herzegovina; 43°46′53″N 19°17′17″E	Cultural: (ii)(iv)	1.50 (3.7); buffer zone 12 (30)	2007	
Meteora	Rock pillars with buildings on top of some of them.	Trikala, Thessaly, Greece; 39°43′0″N 21°38′0″E	Mixed: (i)(ii)(iv)(v)(vii)	272 (670); buffer zone 1,884 (4,660)	1988	In a region of almost inaccessible sandstone peaks, monks settled on these 'columns of the sky' from the 11th century onwards. Twenty-four of these monasteries were built, despite incredible difficulties, at the time of the great revival of the eremitic ideal in the 15th century. Their 16th-century frescoes mark a key stage in the development of post-Byzantine painting.
Minoan Palatial Centres		Crete, Greece; 35°14′53″N 24°53′13″E	Cultural: (ii)(iii)(iv)(vi)	30 (74); buffer zone 1,569 (3,880)	2025	
Monasteries of Daphni, Hosios Loukas and Nea Moni of Chios	Mosaic of a baptemn.	Attica, Central Greece and North Aegean, Greece; 38°24′0″N 22°45′0″E	Cultural: (i)(iv)	3.70 (9.1); buffer zone 5,816 (14,370)	1990	Although geographically distant from each other, these three monasteries belong to the same typological series and share the same aesthetic characteristics. The churches are built on a cross-in-square plan with a large dome supported by squinches defining an octagonal space. In the 11th and 12th centuries they were decorated with superb marble works as well as mosaics on a gold background, all characteristic of the 'second golden age of Byzantine art'.
Monastery and Site of the Escorial, Madrid	A large building complex with towers.	San Lorenzo de El Escorial, Community of Madrid, Spain; 40°34′54″N 4°7′35″W	Cultural: (i)(ii)(vi)	—	1984	El Escorial is one of several Spanish royal sites due to its history as a residence of the royal family. The palace was designed by King Philip II and architect Juan Bautista de Toledo to serve as a monument to Spain's central role in the Christian world.
Monastery of Alcobaça	Church facade integrated into a complex of white buildings with red roofs.	Alcobaça, Leiria District, Portugal; 39°33′0″N 8°58′36″W	Cultural: (i)(iv)	—	1989	
Monastery of Batalha	Gothic church	Batalha, Leiria District, Portugal; 39°39′28″N 8°49′37″W	Cultural: (i)(ii)	0.98 (2.4); buffer zone 86 (210)	1983	
Monastery of the Hieronymites and Tower of Belém in Lisbon	White tower near the sea.	Lisbon, Portugal; 38°41′31″N 9°12′57″W	Cultural: (iii)(vi)	2.66 (6.6); buffer zone 103 (250)	1983 (Note: Extension of the buffer zone of the Tower of Belém in 2008.)	
Monte San Giorgio	A wooded mountain and a lake.	Italy*; Switzerland* 45°53′20″N 8°54′50″E	Natural: (viii)	1,089 (2,690); buffer zone 3,207 (7,920)	2003 (Note: Extended in 2010 to include the Italian portion of the site.)	
Monuments of Oviedo and the Kingdom of the Asturias	High and narrow stone church building.	Asturias, Spain; 43°21′45″N 5°50′35″W	Cultural: (i)(ii)(iv)	—	1985 (Note: Extended in 1998 to include the Cámara Santa, San Julián de los Prados and the La Foncalada fountain in Oviedo. Name change from Churches of the Kingdom of the Asturias to the present name.)	The Kingdom of Asturias remained the only Christian region of Spain in the 9th century. It developed its own style of Pre-Romanesque art and architecture that is displayed in various churches and other monuments. The original entry titled "Churches of the Kingdom of the Asturias" and was extended to include other monuments such as La Foncalada.
Mount Athos	A large building complex and church built on a cliffside.	Autonomous region of Mount Athos, Greece; 40°16′0″N 24°13′0″E	Mixed: (i)(ii)(iv)(v)(vi)(vii)	33,042 (81,650)	1988	An Orthodox spiritual centre since 1054, Mount Athos has enjoyed an autonomous statute since Byzantine times. The 'Holy Mountain', which is forbidden to women and children, is also a recognized artistic site. The layout of the monasteries (about 20 of which are presently inhabited by some 1,400 monks) had an influence as far afield as Russia, and its school of painting influenced the history of Orthodox art.
Mount Etna		Sicily, Italy; 37°45′22″N 14°59′48″E	Natural: (viii)	19,237 (47,540)	2013	
Mudejar Architecture of Aragon	A tower of reddish stone.	Teruel and Zaragoza Provinces, Aragon, Spain; 40°20′38″N 1°6′26″W	Cultural: (ii)(iv)(vi)	—	1986 (Note: Extended in 2001 to include architecture outside of Teruel in Calatayud, Cervera de la Cañada, Tobed and Zaragoza. Name change from Mudejar Architecture of Teruel to the present name.)	The original listing contained four churches in Teruel in the Mudéjar style, a blending of traditional Islamic and contemporary European styles. In 2001, the listing was expanded to include an additional six monuments.
Natural and Cultural Heritage of the Ohrid region	Stone church next to a lake.	Ohrid Municipality, North Macedonia; 41°7′5″N 20°48′48″E	Mixed: (i)(iii)(iv)(vii)	83,350 (206,000)	1979 (Note: Extended in 1980 to include the cultural and historical area and name change from Lake Ohrid to Ohrid region with its cultural and historical aspects and its natural environment. Minor boundary modification in 2009.)	
Natural and Culturo-Historical Region of Kotor	A town in rocky mountains next to a bay or lake.	Bay of Kotor, Kotor and surrounding territory, Montenegro; 42°29′0″N 18°42′0″E	Cultural: (i)(ii)(iii)(iv)	—	1979	The site had been listed as endangered 1979–2003 following the damage due to the 1979 Montenegro earthquake.
Old Bridge Area of the Old City of Mostar	A high bridge across a river with its peak at the middle.	Herzegovina-Neretva Canton, Bosnia and Herzegovina; 43°20′53″N 17°48′39″E	Cultural: (vi)	—	2005	
Old City of Dubrovnik	Marina in a city with churches and a fort.	Dubrovnik-Neretva County, Croatia; 42°39′2″N 18°5′29″E	Cultural: (i)(iii)(iv)	97 (240); buffer zone 54 (130)	1979 (Note: Extended in 1994.)	Dubrovnik became a prosperous Maritime republic during the Middle Ages, it became the only eastern Adriatic city-state to rival Venice. Supported by its wealth and skilled diplomacy, the city achieved a remarkable level of development, particularly during the 15th and 16th centuries. The site had been listed as World Heritage in Danger 1991–1998 due to the Croatian War of Independence.
Old City of Salamanca	Cityscape with two large churches.	Province of Salamanca, Castile and León, Spain; 40°57′55″N 5°39′52″W	Cultural: (i)(ii)(iv)	—	1988	Salamanca is important as a university city, as the University of Salamanca, founded in 1218, is the oldest in Spain and among the oldest in Europe. The city was first conquered by the Carthaginians in the 3rd century, and later ruled by the Romans and Moors. The city centre represents Romanesque, Gothic, Moorish, Renaissance, and Baroque architecture.
Old Town of Ávila with its Extra-Muros Churches	Defensive stone wall with semi-circular towers.	Province of Ávila, Castile and León, Spain; 40°39′23″N 4°42′0″W	Cultural: (iii)(iv)	—	1985 (Note: Minor extension of the boundary in 2007.)	The defensive wall surrounding the original town was constructed in the 11th century. It features 82 semicircular towers and 9 gates, and is one of the most complete examples of town walls in Spain.
Old Town of Cáceres	An old town with churches built on a hillside.	Province of Cáceres, Extremadura, Spain; 39°28′28″N 6°22′12″W	Cultural: (iii)(iv)	—	1986	The old town combines Roman, Islamic, Northern Gothic, and Italian Renaissance architectural influences, including more than 30 Islamic towers.
Old Town of Corfu	View over an old town near the sea with a castle.	Corfu, Ionian Islands, Greece; 39°37′26″N 19°55′39″E	Cultural: (iv)	70 (170); buffer zone 162 (400)	2007	The Old Town of Corfu, on the Island of Corfu off the western coasts of Albania and Greece, is located in a strategic position at the entrance of the Adriatic Sea, and has its roots in the 8th century BC. The three forts of the town, designed by renowned Venetian engineers, were used for four centuries to defend the maritime trading interests of the Republic of Venice against the Ottoman Empire. In the course of time, the forts were repaired and partly rebuilt several times, more recently under British rule in the 19th century. The mainly neoclassical housing stock of the Old Town is partly from the Venetian period, partly of later construction, notably the 19th century. As a fortified Mediterranean port, Corfu's urban and port ensemble is notable for its high level of integrity and authenticity.
Old Town of Segovia and its Aqueduct	A three-storied aqueduct running through a town.	Province of Segovia, Castile and León, Spain; 40°56′54.5″N 4°7′9″W	Cultural: (i)(iii)(iv)	—	1985	The Roman aqueduct was constructed in the 1st century, the medieval Alcázar palace in the 11th century, and the cathedral in the 16th.
Palau de la Música Catalana and Hospital de Sant Pau, Barcelona	A large building complex of red stone.	Province of Barcelona, Catalonia, Spain; 41°23′16″N 2°10′30″E	Cultural: (i)(ii)(iv)	—	1997 (Note: Minor modification of the buffer zone in 2008.)	Both buildings were constructed in the early 20th century and designed by Lluís Domènech i Montaner in the modernist Art Nouveau movement that was very popular in Barcelona in that period. The two buildings are Montaner's most famous works.
Paleochristian and Byzantine Monuments of Thessalonika	A church with a square bell tower.	Thessaloniki, Central Macedonia, Greece; 40°38′18″N 22°57′54″E	Cultural: (i)(ii)(iv)	5.33 (13.2)	1988	Founded in 315 B.C., the provincial capital and sea port of Thessalonika was one of the first bases for the spread of Christianity. Among its Christian monuments are fine churches, some built on the Greek cross plan and others on the three-nave basilica plan. Constructed over a long period, from the 4th to the 15th century, they constitute a diachronic typological series, which had considerable influence in the Byzantine Empire.
Palmeral of Elche	A forest of palm trees with a city in the background.	Province of Alicante, Valencian Community, Spain; 38°16′10″N 0°41′54″W	Cultural: (ii)(v)	—	2000	The grove of date palm trees was formally laid out with irrigation systems under the Moors in the 10th century. The palmeral is a rare example of Arab agricultural practices in Europe.
Piazza del Duomo, Pisa	White church, leaning tower and a circular building.	City and Province of Pisa, Tuscany, Italy; 43°43′23″N 10°23′47″E	Cultural: (i)(ii)(iv)(vi)	8.87 (21.9); buffer zone 254 (630)	1987 (Note: Minor modification to boundaries in 2007.)	
Plitvice Lakes National Park	Turqois colored lakes among white rocks.	Lika-Senj County, Croatia; 44°52′40″N 15°36′52″E	Natural: (vii)(viii)(ix)	19,200 (47,000)	1979 (Note: Extended in 2000 by 10,020 ha (24,800 acres) to ensure the integrity of the site.)	Over time, water has flown over the natural limestone and chalk, creating natural dams which in turn have created a series of connecting lakes, waterfalls, and caves. The nearby forests are home to bears, wolves and many rare bird species. The site had been listed as endangered 1992–1997 due to the potential threat from the Croatian War of Independence.
Poblet Monastery	Entrance to a beige stone church decorated with sculptures..	Vimbodí i Poblet, Province of Tarragona, Catalonia, Spain; 41°22′51″N 1°4′57″E	Cultural: (i)(iv)	—	1991	The monastery was founded by the Cistercians in 1151 and is one of the largest in Spain. It is associated with various royal families in medieval Spain, particularly the kings of the Crown of Aragon, a composite monarchy of the dynastic union of the Kingdom of Aragon and the County of Barcelona. It is the burial place of the Crown of Aragon monarchs Alfonso II, John I, John II, James I, Ferdinana I, and Peter IV.
Portovenere, Cinque Terre, and the Islands (Palmaria, Tino and Tinetto)	A coastal town with multi storied colorful houses.	Province of La Spezia, Liguria, Italy; 44°6′25″N 9°43′45″E	Cultural: (ii)(iv)(v)	4,689 (11,590)	1997	
Prehistoric Pile dwellings around the Alps	Pile dwelling over a lake.	Austria*; France*; Germany*; Italy*; Slovenia*; Switzerland* 47°16′42″N 8°12′27″E	Cultural: (iv)(v)	274 (680); buffer zone 3,961 (9,790)	2011	
Prehistoric Rock Art Sites in the Côa Valley and Siega Verde	Rock carvings of animals including a horse.	Portugal*; Spain* 40°41′51″N 6°39′40″W	Cultural: (i)(iii)	—	1998 (Note: Extended in 2010 by the Siega Verde site in Spain and name change from Prehistoric Rock Art Sites in the Côa Valley to the present name.)	The original 1998 listing contained examples of Upper Palaeolithic rock art in the Côa Valley of Portugal. In 2010 it was extended to include 645 engravings in the archaeological zone of Siega Verde in Spain. The two sites represent the most well-preserved collection of open-air Palaolithic art in the Iberian peninsula.
Pyrénées – Mont Perdu	A rocky mountain landscape.	Gèdre, Hautes-Pyrénées, Midi-Pyrénées, France*; Communes of Torla, Fanlo, Tella-Sin, Puértolas and Bielsa in Province of Huesca, Aragon, Spain* 42°41′N 0°0′E	Mixed: (iii)(iv)(v)(vii)(viii)	30,639 (75,710)	1997 (Note: Extended in 1999 by an area of 550 ha (1,400 acres) in the upper Valley of Héas.)	The site contains the Pyrenees mountain chain along the French-Spanish border. The Spanish portion contains two of the largest canyons in Europe, while the French side contains three large cirque walls
Pythagoreion and Heraion of Samos	Ruins and a column.	Samos, North Aegean, Greece; 37°41′27″N 26°56′36″E	Cultural: (ii)(iii)	668 (1,650); buffer zone 402 (990)	1992	Many civilizations have inhabited this small Aegean island, near Asia Minor, since the 3rd millennium B.C. The remains of Pythagoreion, an ancient fortified port with Greek and Roman monuments and a spectacular tunnel-aqueduct, as well as the Heraion, temple of the Samian Hera, can still be seen.
Renaissance Monumental Ensembles of Úbeda and Baeza	A stone church with one tower.	Province of Jaen, Andalusia, Spain; 38°0′41″N 3°22′16″W	Cultural: (ii)(iv)	9.00 (22.2); buffer zone 176 (430)	2003	Renovations of the two towns in the 16th century were done under the emerging Renaissance style and are among the first examples of the style in Spain.
Residences of the Royal House of Savoy	Large symmetrical palace complex with white walls.	Province of Turin, Piedmont, Italy; 45°4′21″N 7°41′9″E	Cultural: (i)(ii)(iv)(v)	371 (920); buffer zone 6,931 (17,130)	1997 (Note: Minor modification of boundaries in 2010.)	
Rhaetian Railway in the Albula / Bernina Landscapes	A train running through a snowy mountain valley.	Italy*; Switzerland* 46°29′54″N 9°50′47″E	Cultural: (ii)(iv)	152 (380); buffer zone 109,386 (270,300)	2008	
Rock Art of the Mediterranean Basin on the Iberian Peninsula	Rock drawing of a deer.	Andalusia, Aragon, Castile–La Mancha, Catalonia, Murcia and Valencia, Spain; 39°47′24″N 1°2′0″W	Cultural: (iii)	—	1998	The site includes over 750 examples of rock art from the late prehistoric period, which feature images ranging from geometric shapes to scenes of men hunting animals.
Rock Drawings in Valcamonica	Rock drawing of warriors.	Province of Brescia, Lombardy, Italy; 45°57′25″N 10°17′50″E	Cultural: (iii)(vi)	432 (1,070); buffer zone 1,018 (2,520)	1979	
Roman Walls of Lugo	A stone wall.	Province of Lugo, Galicia, Spain; 43°0′40″N 7°33′12″W	Cultural: (iv)	—	2000	The walls built to protect the Roman town of Lucus in the 3rd century remain entirely intact and are the best remaining example in Western Europe.
Routes of Santiago de Compostela: Camino Francés and Routes of Northern Spain	A shell and a drinking bottle.	Aragon, Navarre, La Rioja, Castile and León and Galicia, Spain; 42°27′33″N 5°53′0″W	Cultural: (ii)(iv)(vi)	—	1993	The Route, or the Way of St. James, is a pilgrimage from the French-Spanish border to the Cathedral of Santiago de Compostela, where the apostle James is believed to be buried.
Royal Monastery of Santa María de Guadalupe	A complex of various buildings including towers made of natural stones.	Guadalupe, Province of Cáceres, Extremadura, Spain; 39°27′10″N 5°19′39″W	Cultural: (iv)(vi)	—	1993	The monastery is home of Our Lady of Guadalupe, a shrine to Mary found in the 13th century after being buried from Muslim invaders in 714. The Virgin of Guadalupe and the monastery served as important symbols during the Reconquista, culminating in 1492, the same year as Columbus' discovery of America. The Guadalupe Virgin became an important symbol during the evangelization of America.
Sacri Monti of Piedmont and Lombardy	A circular building on top of a mountain.	Lombardy, Piedmont, Italy; 45°58′28″N 9°10′10″E	Cultural: (ii)(iv)	91 (220); buffer zone 722 (1,780)	2003	
Sanctuary of Asklepios at Epidaurus	Ruins of an amphitheatre.	Argolis, Peloponnese, Greece; 37°40′0″N 23°7′0″E	Cultural: (i)(ii)(iii)(iv)(vi)	1,394 (3,440); buffer zone 3,386 (8,370)	1988	In a small valley in the Peloponnesus, the shrine of Asklepios, the god of medicine, developed out of a much earlier cult of Apollo, during the 6th century BC at the latest, as the official cult of the city state of Epidaurus. Its principal monuments, particularly the temple of Asklepios, the Tholos and the Theatre – considered one of the purest masterpieces of Greek architecture – date from the 4th century. The vast site, with its temples and hospital buildings devoted to its healing gods, provides valuable insight into the healing cults of Greek and Roman times.
Sanctuary of Bom Jesus do Monte in Braga		Braga, Portugal; 41°33′16″N 8°22′40″W	Cultural: (iv)	26 (64)	2019	
San Marino Historic Centre and Mount Titano	Mountain with some rocks and three fortresses on top.	San Marino; 43°55′58″N 12°27′7″E	Cultural: (iii)	55 (140); buffer zone 167 (410)	2008	
San Millán Yuso and Suso Monasteries	An old church building of stone.	San Millán de la Cogolla, La Rioja, Spain; 42°19′33″N 2°51′54″W	Cultural: (ii)(iv)(vi)	19 (47); buffer zone 266 (660)	1997	The original Suso monastery was founded in the mid-6th century, and is the location where the Glosas Emilianenses were written. The codixes are considered the first written examples of the Spanish and Basque languages, and the monastery is considered the birthplace of written and spoken Spanish. The newer Yuso monastery was built in the 16th century.
Royal Building of Mafra – Palace, Basilica, Convent, Cerco Garden and Hunting Park (Tapada)		Mafra, Portugal; 38°56′12″N 9°19′35″W	Cultural: (iv)	1,213.17 (2,997.8)	2019	
Santiago de Compostela (Old Town)	A large cathedral with many towers.	Province of A Coruña, Galicia, Spain; 42°52′51″N 8°32′41″W	Cultural: (i)(ii)(vi)	—	1985	The Cathedral of Santiago de Compostela is the reputed burial-place of the apostle James, and is the terminus of the Way of St. James, a pilgrimage across northern Spain. The town was destroyed by Muslims in the 10th century and rebuilt during the following century.
Škocjan Caves	Very large entrance to a cave.	Škocjan, Slovenia; 45°40′0″N 14°0′0″E	Natural: (vii)(viii)	413 (1,020)	1986	
Stari Grad Plain	Foundations of a former building and a plain with trees.	Split-Dalmatia County, Croatia; 43°10′54″N 16°38′19″E	Cultural: (ii)(iii)(v)	1,377 (3,400); buffer zone 6,403 (15,820)	2008	The Stari Grad Plain is an agricultural landscape that was set up by the ancient Greek colonists in the 4th century BC, and remains in use today. The plain is generally still in its original form. The ancient layout has been preserved by careful maintenance of the stone walls over 24 centuries.
Stari Ras and Sopoćani	Ruins of a fortress in the mountains.	near Novi Pazar, Raška District, Serbia; 43°7′8″N 20°25′22″E	Cultural: (i)(iii)	199 (490); buffer zone 9,936 (24,550)	1979	On the outskirts of Stari Ras, the first capital of Serbia, there is a group of medieval monuments consisting of fortresses, churches and monasteries. The monastery at Sopoćani is a reminder of the contacts between Western civilization and the Byzantine world.
Stećci Medieval Tombstones Graveyards		Bosnia and Herzegovina*; Croatia*; Montenegro*; Serbia*; 43°5′31.97″N 17°55′26.59″E	Cultural: (iii)(vi)	49 (120); buffer zone 321 (790)	2016	
Studenica Monastery		Kraljevo, Raška District, Serbia; 43°29′10″N 20°32′12″E	Cultural: (i)(ii)(iv)(vi)	1.16 (2.9); buffer zone 269 (660)	1986	The Studenica Monastery was established in the late 12th century by Stefan Nemanja, founder of the medieval Serb state, shortly after his abdication. It is the largest and richest of Serbia's Orthodox monasteries. Its two principal monuments, the Church of the Virgin and the Church of the King, both built of white marble, enshrine priceless collections of 13th- and 14th-century Byzantine painting.
Su Nuraxi di Barumini	Foundations of former circular buildings.	Barumini, Province of Medio Campidano, Sardinia, Italy; 39°42′21″N 8°59′29″E	Cultural: (i)(iii)(iv)	2.33 (5.8); buffer zone 3.92 (9.7)	1997	
Syracuse and the Rocky Necropolis of Pantalica	Rock caves on a hillside.	City and Province of Syracuse, Sicily, Italy; 37°3′34″N 15°17′35″E	Cultural: (ii)(iii)(iv)(vi)	—	2005	
Temple of Apollo Epicurius at Bassae	Ruins of a temple with columns.	Messenia, Arcadia and Elis, Western Peloponnese, Greece; 37°26′6″N 21°53′49″E	Cultural: (i)(ii)(iii)	20 (49); buffer zone 202 (500)	1986	This famous temple to the god of healing and the sun was built towards the middle of the 5th century B.C. in the lonely heights of the Arcadian mountains. The temple, which has the oldestCorinthian capital yet found, combines the Archaic style and the serenity of the Doric style with some daring architectural features.
Šibenik Cathedral	A white church with a dome.	Šibenik, Šibenik-Knin County, Croatia; 43°44′11″N 15°53′25″E	Cultural: (i)(ii)(iv)	0.10 (0.25)	2000	The cathedral is a triple-nave basilica with three apses and a dome (32 m high inside) and is also one of the most important architectural monument of the Renaissance in the eastern Adriatic.
The Dolomites	A rocky mountain landscape.	Italy; 46°36′47″N 12°9′47″E	Natural: (vii)(viii)	141,903 (350,650); buffer zone 89,267 (220,580)	2009	
The Historic Centre (Chorá) with the Monastery of Saint-John the Theologian and the Cave of the Apocalypse on the Island of Pátmos	Fortress of dark stones on a hill above a town with white houses.	Patmos, Dodecanese, South Aegean, Greece; 37°18′0″N 26°33′0″E	Cultural: (ii)(iv)(vi)	—	1999	The small island of Pátmos in the Dodecanese is reputed to be where St John the Theologian wrote both his Gospel and the Apocalypse. A monastery dedicated to the ‘beloved disciple’ was founded there in the late 10th century and it has been a place of pilgrimage and Greek Orthodox learning ever since. The fine monastic complex dominates the island. The old settlement of Chorá, associated with it, contains many religious and secular buildings.
The Porticoes of Bologna		Bologna, Emilia-Romagna, Italy	Cultural (iv)	52.18 ha	2021	The serial property comprises twelve component parts consisting of ensembles of porticoes and their surrounding built areas, located within the Municipality of Bologna from the 12th century to the present. Defined as private property for public use, the porticoes have become an expression and element of Bologna's urban identity.
The Prosecco Hills of Conegliano and Valdobbiadene. ("Le Colline del Prosecco di Conegliano e Valdobbiadene")		Veneto, Italy; 45°57′10.9″N 12°13′34″E	Cultural: (v)	20,334.2 (50,247)	2019	Winegrowing landscape characterized by ciclioni hills, forests, small villages and farmland, for centuries shaped and adapted by man.
The Sassi and the Park of the Rupestrian Churches of Matera	Structures built into the rock.	City and Province of Matera, Basilicata, Italy; 40°39′59″N 16°36′37″E	Cultural: (iii)(iv)(v)	1,016 (2,510); buffer zone 4,365 (10,790)	1993	
The Trulli of Alberobello	Small white houses with conic roofs.	Province of Bari, Apulia, Italy; 40°46′57″N 17°14′13″E	Cultural: (iii)(iv)(v)	11 (27)	1996	
The works of Jože Plečnik in Ljubljana – Human Centred Urban Design		Ljubjana and Črna Vas, Slovenia; 46°02′36″N 14°30′08″E	Cultural: (iv)	19.1 (47); buffer zone 194 (480)	2021 (Note: Minor modification of boundaries in 2023.)	
Tower of Hercules	A stone tower with a square base topped by two octagonal sections.	A Coruña, Galicia, Spain; 43°23′9″N 8°24′23″W	Cultural: (iii)	233 (580); buffer zone 1,936 (4,780)	2009	The Romans built this 55 metres (180 ft) lighthouse on a 57 metres (187 ft) rock to mark the entrance to the A Coruña harbor. It is the only fully preserved and functioning Roman lighthouse.
University and Historic Precinct of Alcalá de Henares	Plateresque facade of a three storied building.	Community of Madrid, Spain; 40°28′53″N 3°22′5″W	Cultural: (ii)(iv)(vi)	—	1998	Cardinal Cisneros founded the University of Alcalá in 1499 and is the first example of the planned university city, serving as a model to other European universities and Spanish missionaries in America. The city is the birthplace of Miguel de Cervantes, known for his contributions to the Spanish language and Western literature.
University of Coimbra – Alta and Sofia	A number of buildings surrounding a central court with a clocktower to the left.	Coimbra, Portugal; 40°12′28″N 8°25′32.79″W	Cultural: (ii)(iv)(vi)	36 (89); buffer zone 82 (200)	2013	
Val d'Orcia	Hilly grass landscape.	Province of Siena, Tuscany, Italy; 43°4′N 11°33′E	Cultural: (iv)(vi)	61,188 (151,200); buffer zone 5,660 (14,000)	2004	
Vatican City	Large circular square with columned buildings and an obelisk in the middle.	Holy See; 41°54′8″N 12°27′27″E	Cultural: (i)(ii)(iv)(vi)	—	1984	
Venice and its Lagoon	A city with churches among water.	Province of Venezia, Veneto, Italy; 45°26′3.5″N 12°20′20″E	Cultural: (i)(ii)(iii)(iv)(v)(vi)	—	1987	
Via Appia. Regina Viarum		Apulia, Basilicata, Campania and Lazio, Italy; 41°50′29″N 12°31′57″E	Cultural: (iii)(iv)(vi)	4,951 (12,230); buffer zone 42,589 (105,240)	2024	
Villa Adriana (Tivoli)	Ruins of a stone building.	Tivoli, Province of Rome, Lazio, Italy; 41°56′39″N 12°46′19″E	Cultural: (i)(ii)(iii)	80 (200); buffer zone 500 (1,200)	1999	
Villa d'Este, Tivoli	Fountain and waterfall in a park.	Tivoli, Province of Rome, Lazio, Italy; 41°57′50″N 12°47′47″E	Cultural: (i)(ii)(iii)(iv)(vi)	4.50 (11.1); buffer zone 7.00 (17.3)	2001	
Villa Romana del Casale	Mosaic of girls in bikini playing with a ball.	Piazza Armerina, Province of Enna, Sicily, Italy; 37°21′58″N 14°20′3″E	Cultural: (i)(ii)(iii)	8.92 (22.0); buffer zone 10 (25)	1997	
Vineyard Landscape of Piedmont: Langhe-Roero and Monferrato	Green vineyards cover rolling hills	Langhe and Montferrat, Piedmont, Italy; 44°36′31″N 7°57′49″E	Cultural: (iii)(v)	10,789 (26,660); buffer zone 76,249 (188,420)	2014	The site covers five wine growing areas as well as Cavour Castle. Wine making has existed in Piedmont since at least the Roman era and has continued since then. The region was also an important trading place between the Etruscans and the Celts and traces of their words still appear in the local dialect.
Vizcaya Bridge	A metal transporter bridge running high above a river in a town.	Biscay, Basque Country, Spain; 43°19′23″N 3°1′1″W	Cultural: (i)(ii)	0.86 (2.1); buffer zone 12 (30)	2006	The bridge was designed by Alberto Palacio to cross the Nervion without disrupting maritime traffic to the Port of Bilbao. It was built in 1893 and is the world's first transporter bridge.
Vjetrenica Cave, Ravno		Ravno, Federation of Bosnia and Herzegovina, Bosnia and Herzegovina; 42°50′45″N 17°59′02″E	Natural: (x)	414 (1,020); buffer zone 4,624 (11,430)	2024	
Works of Antoni Gaudí	A large palace structure with many towers under construction.	Province of Barcelona, Catalonia, Spain; 41°24′48″N 2°9′11″E	Cultural: (i)(ii)(iv)	—	1984 (Note: Extended in 2005 to include the Nativity façade and Crypt of Sagrada Familia, Casa Vicens, Casa Batlló, and the Crypt in Colonia Güell. Name change from Parque Güell, Palacio Güell and Casa Mila in Barcelona to the present name.)	The architecture of Antoni Gaudí is part of the Modernist style, but his designs are described as highly unique. The original listing featured Park Güell, Palau Güell, and Casa Milà; the 2005 extension added Casa Vicens, the crypt and nativity façade of Sagrada Família, Casa Batlló, and the crypt at Colònia Güell.
Zagori Cultural Landscape		Ioannina, Epirus, Greece; 39°36′N 20°48′E	Cultural: (v)	—	2023	

== See also ==
- List of World Heritage Sites in Albania
- List of World Heritage Sites in Bosnia and Herzegovina
- List of World Heritage Sites in Croatia
- List of World Heritage Sites in Greece
- List of World Heritage Sites in Italy
- List of World Heritage Sites in Malta
- List of World Heritage Sites in Montenegro
- List of World Heritage Sites in North Macedonia
- List of World Heritage Sites in Portugal
- List of World Heritage Sites in Serbia
- List of World Heritage Sites in Slovenia
- List of World Heritage Sites in Spain
- Vatican City itself is a World Heritage Site
