= Triple Bridge =

Triple Bridge Tromostovje
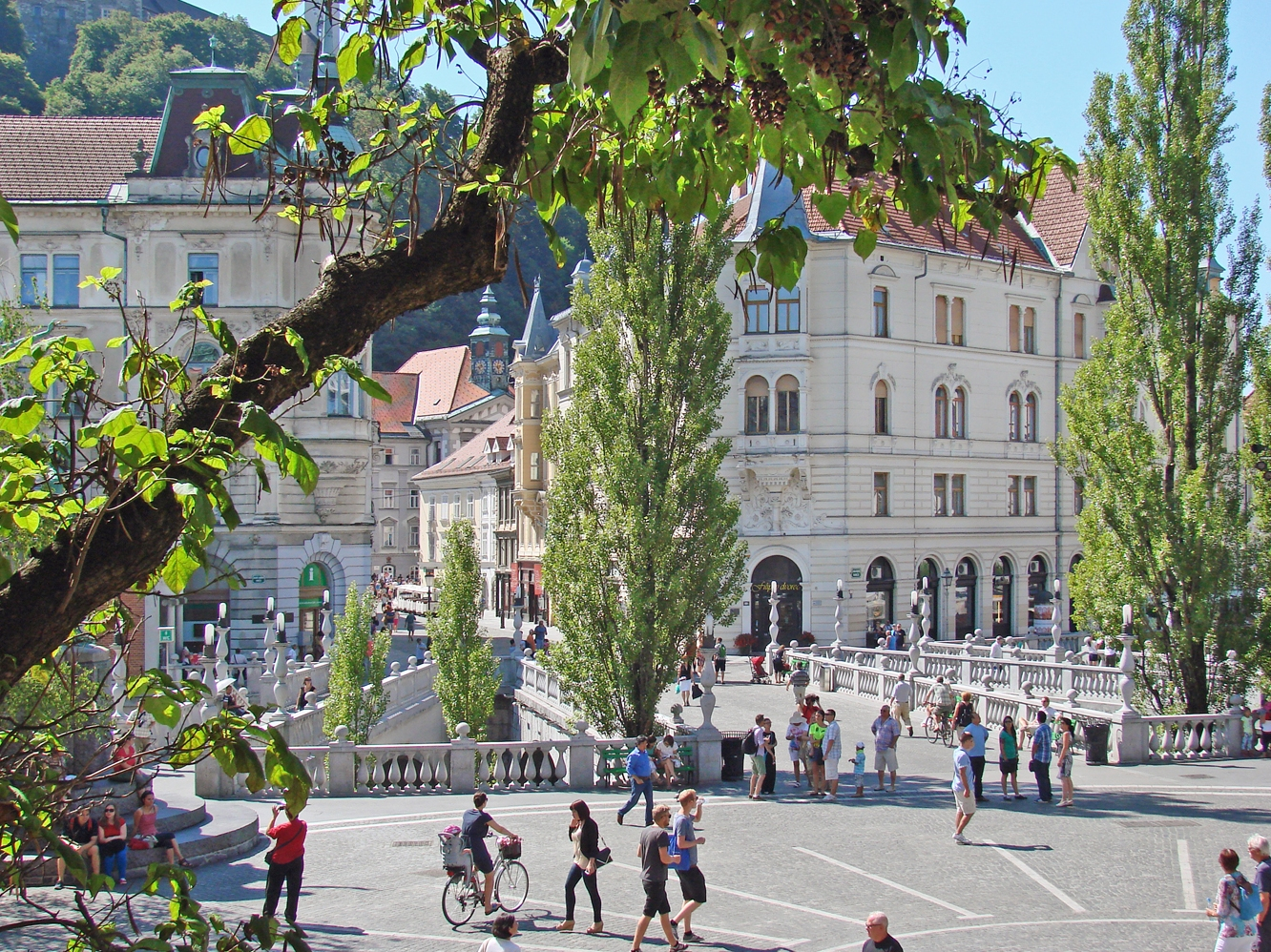
- Overview of the Triple Bridge from the Franciscan church
- Coordinates: 46°03′04″N 14°30′22″E
- Carries: Pedestrians
- Crosses: the Ljubljanica
- Locale: Ljubljana, Slovenia

Characteristics
- Design: Arch

History
- Opened: 1842; 1932

Statistics

UNESCO World Heritage Site
- Official name: The works of Jože Plečnik in Ljubljana – Human Centred Urban Design
- Type: Cultural
- Criteria: iv
- Designated: 2021 (44th session)
- Reference no.: 1643
- Region: Europe and North America

The Triple Bridge (Slovene: Tromostovje, in older sources also Tromostje) comprises three bridges spanning the Ljubljanica River in Ljubljana, the capital of Slovenia. It connects the historical medieval town on the southeastern bank with the central Prešeren Square on the northwestern bank. Dating back to the 13th century, it stands as the oldest bridge in Ljubljana. In the early 1930s, the architect Jože Plečnik redesigned and expanded it. In August 2021, the Triple Bridge was added to the UNESCO World Heritage List as part of Plečnik's enduring legacy.

== Design ==
The Triple Bridge from pedestrian perspective.

The central bridge is partly built from Glinica limestone. Other parts are built from concrete. The balustrades with 642 balusters are made of concrete. The platform is paved with granite blocks laid in 2010. Previously, it was paved with asphalt.

== History ==
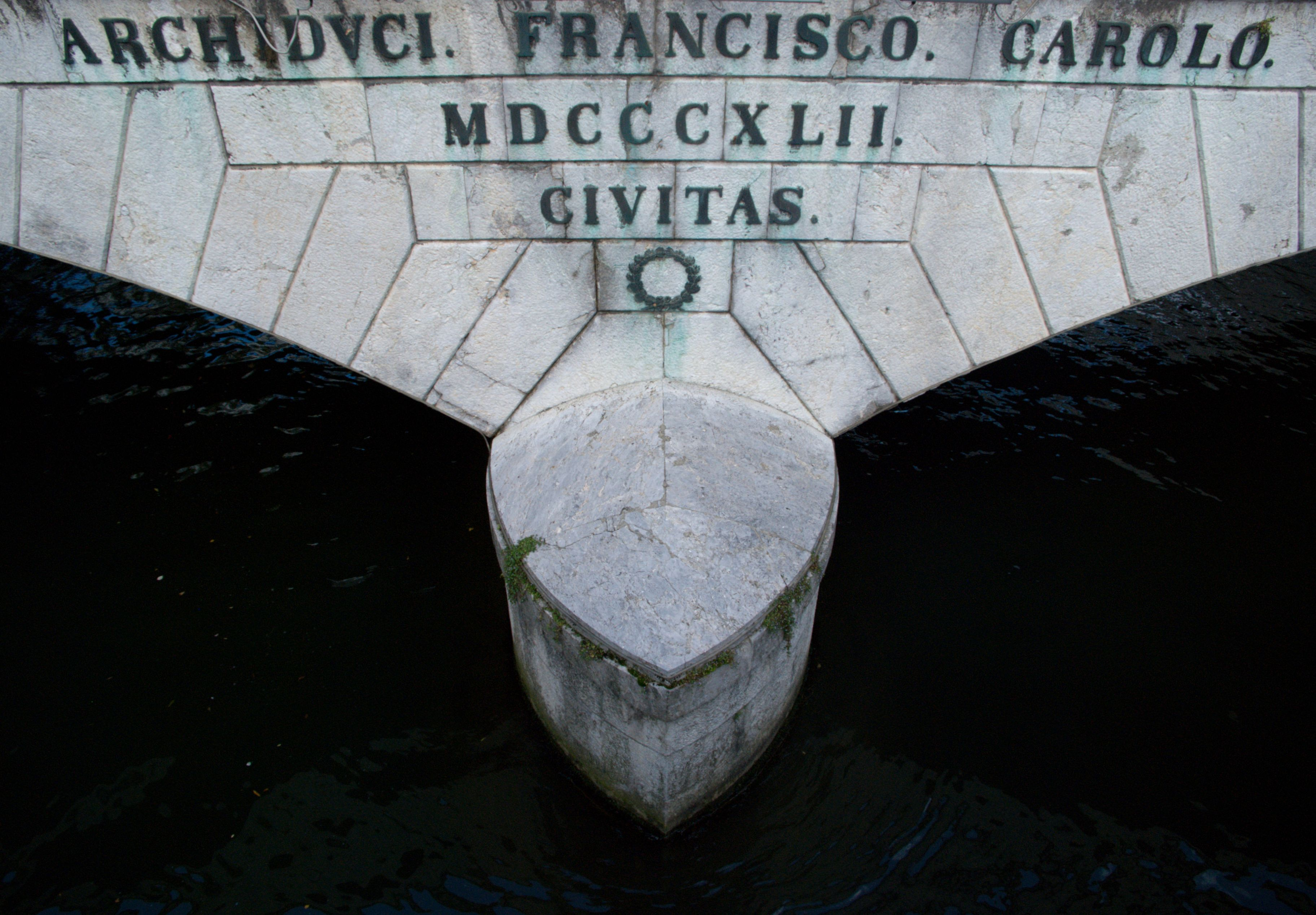
The Latin inscription on the upstream side of the central bridge: "To Archduke Franz Karl. 1842. The town."

There is mention of a wooden bridge in this location from 1280. It was at first called the Old Bridge (Stari most) and later the Lower Bridge (Spodnji most), in contrast to the Upper Bridge that was built in the location of the nowadays Cobblers' Bridge in the same century. It was also named the Špital Bridge (Špitalski most) after the nearby poorhouse, which was established in the early 14th century. It was built anew in 1657 after a fire.

In 1842, the Lower Bridge was replaced by a new bridge designed by Giovanni Picco, an Italian architect from Villach, and named Franz's Bridge, (Frančev most) in honor of Archduke Franz Karl of Austria. It also became known as the Franciscan Bridge (Frančiškanski most). This bridge, opened on 25 September 1842, had two arches and a metal fence. The essentials of the bridge have been preserved until today, which is evidenced by the inscribed dedication to the archduke above its central pier, reading in Latin "ARCHIDVCI. FRANCISCO. CAROLO. MDCCCXLII. CIVITAS.", which means "To Archduke Franz Karl in 1842 by the Town."

In order to prevent the 1842 stone arch bridge from being a bottleneck, the architect Jože Plečnik designed in 1929 the extension of the bridge with two footbridges at a slight angle on each side of it. In collaboration with his student Ciril Tavčar, who drew the plans, he published the proposal in the same year in the journal Ljubljanski zvon. Construction started in 1931 and continued until spring 1932. The bridge was opened for traffic in April 1932.

The bridge was renovated in 1992. Since 2007, all the three bridges have been part of the Ljubljana pedestrian-only zone.

== Depictions ==
- A model of the bridge is displayed at Mini-Europe in Brussels.
- On 23 January 2012, celebrating the 140th anniversary of Jože Plečnik's birth, a picture of the Triple Bridge was featured as an official Google logo (Doodle) adaptation in Slovenia.

== See also ==
Other bridges designed by Plečnik:

- Butchers' Bridge
- Cobblers' Bridge
- Rooster Bridge
- Ljubljanica Sluice Gate
- Trnovo Bridge
