= The works of Jože Plečnik in Ljubljana – Human Centred Urban Design =

UNESCO World Heritage Site
- Tromostovje bridge in Ljubljana
- Interactive map of The works of Jože Plečnik in Ljubljana – Human Centred Urban Design
- Location: Slovenia
- Criteria: Cultural: (iv)
- Reference: 1643
- Inscription: 2021 (44th Session)

The works of Jože Plečnik in Ljubljana – Human Centred Urban Design is a UNESCO World Heritage Site in Ljubljana, Slovenia, listed in 2021. The site encompasses selected the most prominent works of Slovenian architect Jože Plečnik in Ljubljana with their original function. During the interwar period, Plečnik worked to transform Ljubljana from a provincial city to the capital of the Slovenian nation by creating a series of public spaces and public institutions and integrating them into the pre-existing urban fabric. Sites include the St. Michael's Church in Črna Vas, and the following sites in Ljubljana: the promenade along the embankments of the Ljubljanica River and the bridges crossing it; the "Green promenade": Vegova Street with the National and University Library from French Revolution Square to Congress Square and Star Park, Trnovo Bridge, Roman Walls in Mirje, the Church of St. Francis of Assisi, and the All Saints Garden in Žale Cemetery.

== List of the sites ==
The World Heritage Site comprises seven of Plečnik's works or ensembles:

Name	Image	ID	Coordinates	Property Area	Buffer Zone	Description
Trnovo Bridge	Trnovo bridge with Trnovo church in the background	1643-001	46°02′36″N 14°30′08″E	N/A	N/A	
Green Promenade along Vegova Street	Congress square with Ljubljana Castle in the background	1643-002	46°02′52″N 14°30′12″E	N/A	N/A	
Arch. Plečnik's Marketplace	Plečnik's Marketplace	1643-003	46°02′56″N 14°30′20″E	12.388 ha (30.61 acres)	N/A	
Promenade along the Embankments and Bridges of the Ljubljanica River	Ljubljanica Sluice Gate	1643-003	46°02′56″N 14°30′20″E	12.388 ha (30.61 acres)	N/A	
Roman Walls in Mirje	Reconstructed Roman walls along a road	1643-004	46°02′45″N 14°29′54″E	0.72 ha (1.8 acres)	1.055 ha (2.61 acres)	
Church of St. Michael	Church with stairs leading to the entrance	1643-005	46°00′44″N 14°30′21″E	0.281 ha (0.69 acres)	12.984 ha (32.08 acres)	
Church of St. Francis of Assisi	Side view of the church, entrance with columns and a spire covered by a green roof	1643-006	46°04′06″N 14°29′49″E	1.079 ha (2.67 acres)	30.23 ha (74.7 acres)	
Plečnik’s Žale – Garden of All Saints	Entrance to the cemetery, a portal surrounded by columns	1643-007	46°04′03″N 14°31′43″E	1.323 ha (3.27 acres)	45.752 ha (113.06 acres)	
