= National and University Library of Slovenia =

National library of Slovenia

- NUK - Narodna in univerzitetna knjižnica
- View from Ljubljana Castle
- 46°02′49″N 14°30′14″E
- Location: Ljubljana, Slovenia
- Type: National library, academic library
- Established: 1774 (252 years ago)

Collection
- Size: 2,749,593 volumes

Access and use
- Members: 10,931

Other information
- Budget: €7,479,522 (2014)
- Director: Viljem Leban
- Employees: 138,5
- Website: www.nuk.uni-lj.si

UNESCO World Heritage Site
- Type: Cultural
- Criteria: iv
- Designated: 2021 (44th session)
- Part of: The works of Jože Plečnik in Ljubljana – Human Centred Urban Design
- Reference no.: 1643
- Region: Europe and North America

The National and University Library (Slovene: Narodna in univerzitetna knjižnica, NUK), established in 1774, is one of the most important national educational and cultural institutions of Slovenia. It is located in the centre of Ljubljana, between Auersperg Street (Turjaška ulica), Gentry Street (Gosposka ulica), and Vega Street (Vegova ulica), in a building designed by the architect Jože Plečnik in the years 1930–31 and constructed between 1936 and 1941. The building is considered one of the greatest achievements by Plečnik. Since August 2021, the National and University Library has been inscribed as part of Plečnik's legacy on the UNESCO World Heritage List.

In 2011, the library kept about 1,307,000 books, 8,700 manuscripts, and numerous other text, visual and multimedia resources, and was (in 2010) subscribed to 7900 periodicals. Books and other resources are kept at storehouses at Auersperg Street (Turjaška ulica) and at Leskošek Street (Leskoškova cesta). According to the Mandatory Publications Copy Act, issuers are bound to submit a copy of each publication they publish to the National and University Library. There have been significant problems with a lack of space and a new modern building has been planned to be built in the vicinity.

== History ==
Around 1774, after the dissolution of the Jesuits, the Lyceum Library formed from the remains of the Jesuit Library and several monastery libraries. It was established with a decree issued by Maria Theresa. The submission of legal deposit copies to the Lyceum library became mandatory with a decree published by the Austrian court in 1807, at first only in Carniola, except for a short period of French administration, when it received copies from all the Illyrian provinces. In 1919, it was named State Reference Library and started to collect legal deposit copies from the entire Slovenia of the time. In the same year, the University of Ljubljana (the first Slovenian university) was established and the library served its needs too. In 1921, it started to acquire legal deposit copies from the entire Yugoslavia. It was named University Library in 1938.

== Architecture ==
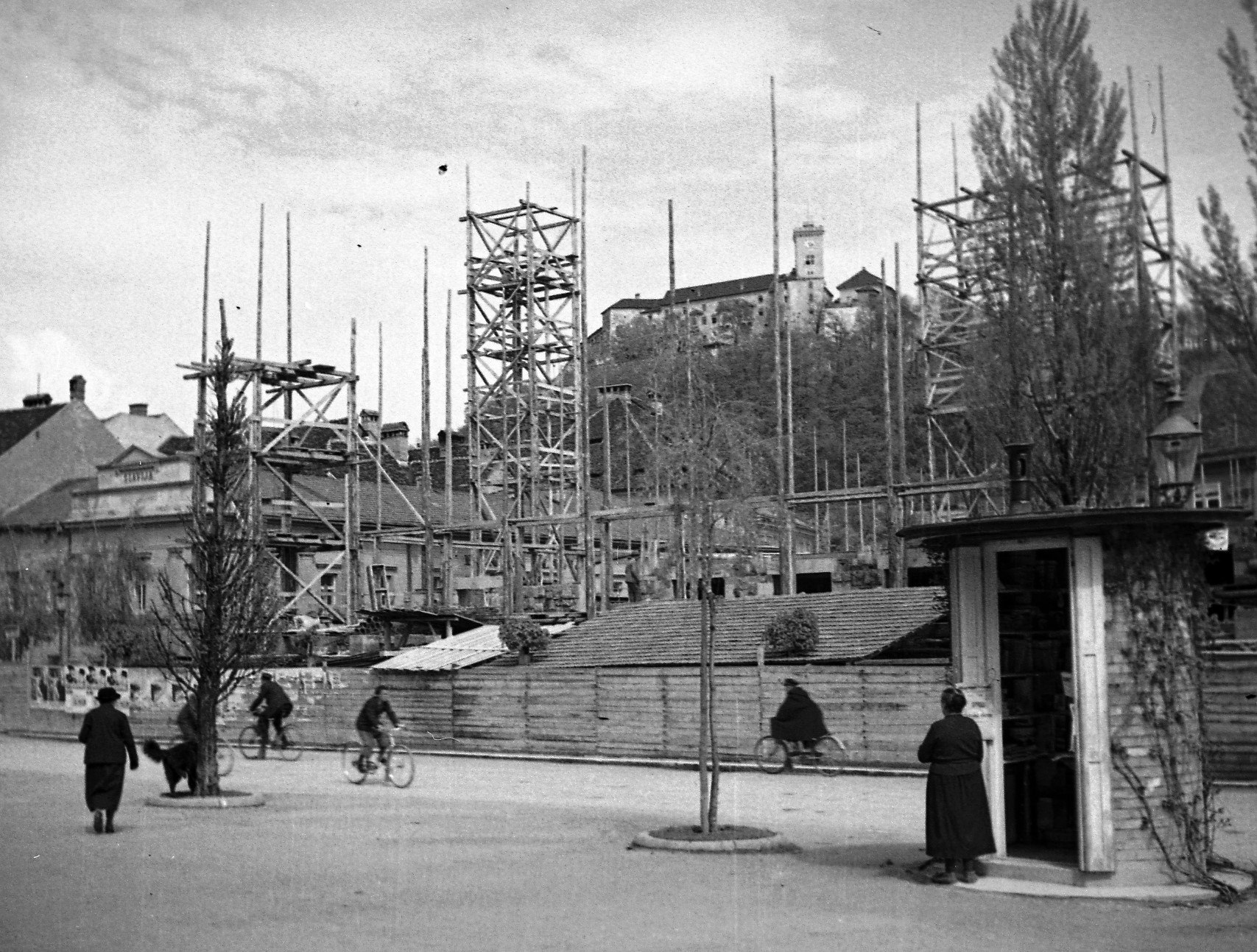
Early phases of construction of the library building (1937)

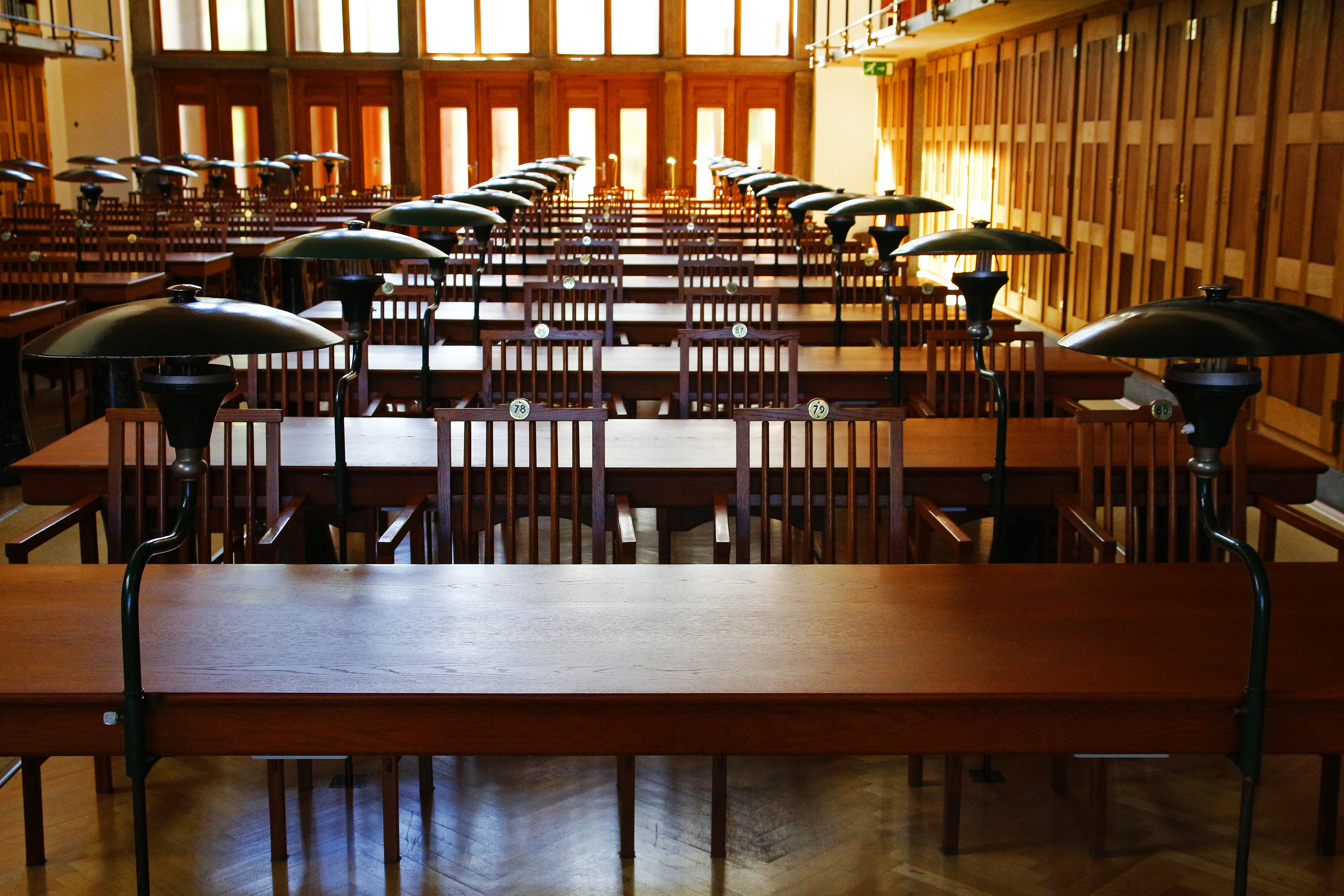
Reading room

Since 1791, the library was located in the building of Ljubljana lyceum. In 1919, additional space was provisionally dedicated to it in the building of the Poljane Grammar School. In 1930–31, plans for a new building were created by Jože Plečnik. Initially the project encountered resistance by the Yugoslavian authorities based in Belgrade. However, persistent student protests and demonstrations have been effective, and the new building was erected between 1936 and 1941 by the company of the constructor Matko Curk.

The library building is the most monumental of Plečnik's works in Slovenia. In its size and form, it models the former Ducal Court (Knežji dvorec), which was at the same location and was destroyed in the 1895 earthquake. The building has a square ground plan and is a massive block with a court. The front façade, oriented toward Auersperg Street, was designed as a combination of brick and stone embeddings, some of them archaeological remains from the place. It was modelled in the manner of the Italian palazzo, similar to the house of the Italian architect Federico Zuccari. The handles of the main door end with a little head of Pegasus. The symbiosis of the fragile glass and massive walls in other parts of exterior is entirely original. The side walls are oriented towards Gentry Street and Vega Street. The side entrance from Gentry Street is decorated with a sculpture of Moses, created by Lojze Dolinar.

The interior comprises four wings and the central hallway. Light comes to the main entrance through windows in the main reading room, which is at the top of the main staircase, oriented crosswise. This symbolises the central thought of the building's architecture, "From the twilight of ignorance to the light of knowledge and enlightenment". The staircase and its 32 columns are built of the dark Podpeč marble, actually limestone. In addition, there is a small staircase with landings in the form of balconies in each of the four corner of the building. The main reading room, modelled after the industrial aesthetics of the 19th century, is decorated with large chandeliers. It has two glass walls at each side, divided in two symmetric parts by a column and forming part of the side walls of the building. There are wooden tables and chairs. The equipment in main spaces of the building is scarce. The cellar was renovated in 2000 by Marko Mušič, when the building was also additionally protected against earthquakes.

The library was depicted on the reverse of the 500 tolar banknote, issued in 1992 by the Bank of Slovenia.

== Expansion ==
A construction of new building of the National and University Library, named NUK II, has been planned since 1987. It will stand on the corner of Zois Street (Zoisova cesta), Slovene Street (Slovenska cesta), Roman Street (Rimska ulica), and Emona Street (Emonska cesta). In a competition in 1989, the proposal put forward by Marko Mušič was chosen. For it and the work in the following years, Mušič was paid over 2 million euros and the country has spent over 30 million euros for NUK II. However, construction was never started. There were several causes for the delay, among them problems in the process of the acquisition of the real estate, the preparation of the documentation necessary to obtain the construction permit and the archaeological excavations of the remains of the Roman castrum Emona that took place in 1990–99 and in 2008. In 2009, the Ministry of Higher Education, Science and Technology, led by Gregor Golobič, found the original plans outdated and decided that the competition had to be repeated. It was carried out again in late 2011 and early 2012. The evaluating committee, led by Aleš Vodopivec, received 120 proposals, almost half of them from outside Slovenia. In May 2012, the committee chose the proposal submitted by the architectural office Bevk Perović arhitekti as the best. The new library will be suited to the digital era, and archaeological remains in the area will be integrated in the overall composition. As of May 2012, the date of the beginning of construction and the expected costs were not yet known. The site has been used as a provisional parking lot.

== See also ==
- List of libraries in Slovenia
