= Trnovo Bridge =

Bridge over the Gradaščica in Ljubljana, Slovenia

Coordinates: 46.0434°N 14.502°E

UNESCO World Heritage Site
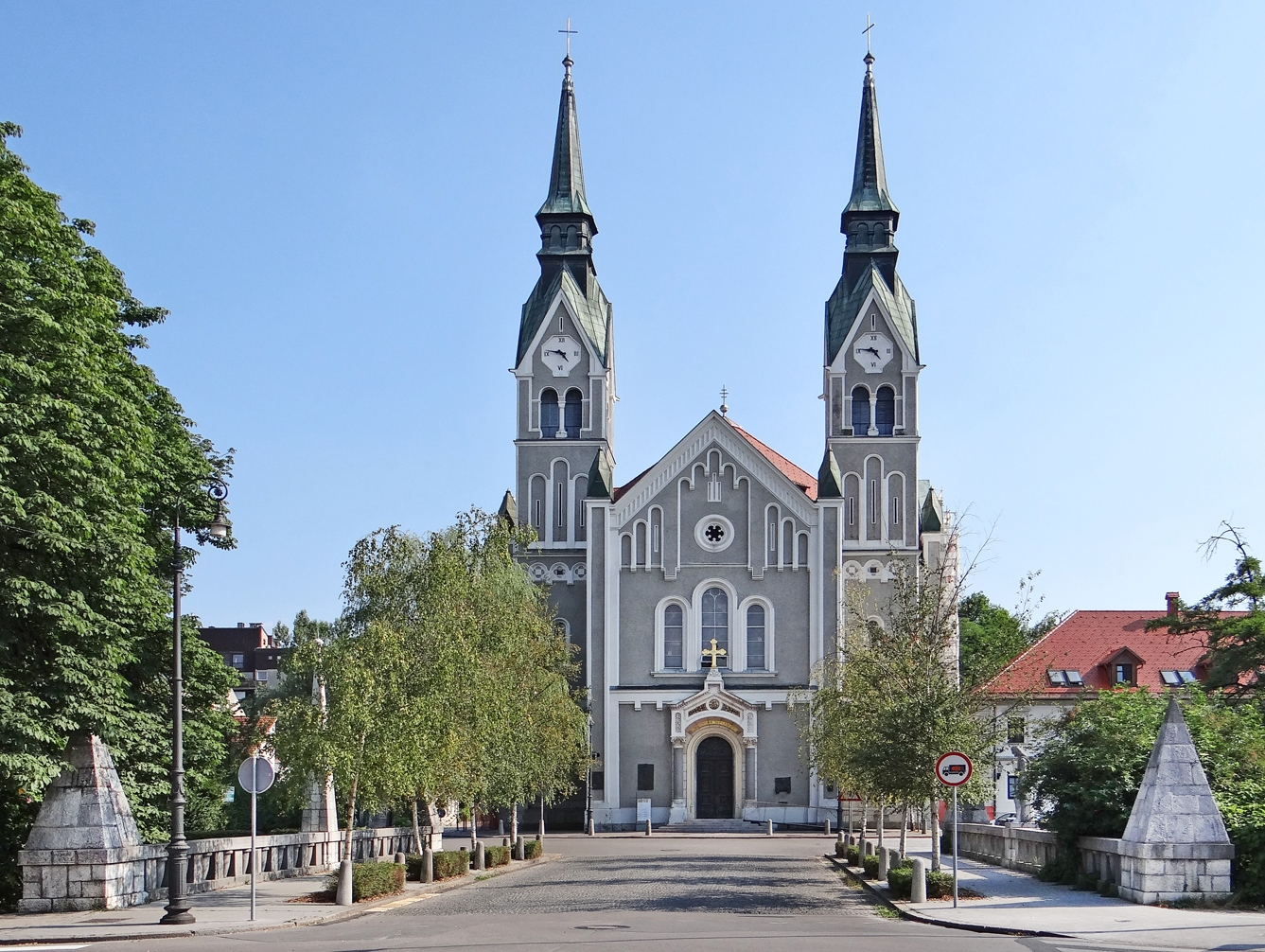
- Trnovo Church, seen from across the bridge
- Interactive map of Trnovo Bridge
- Location: Slovenia
- Part of: The works of Jože Plečnik in Ljubljana – Human Centred Urban Design
- Criteria: Cultural: (iv)
- Reference: 1643
- Inscription: 2021 (44th Session)

The Trnovo Bridge (Slovene: Trnovski most) is a bridge crossing the Gradaščica River in Ljubljana, the capital of Slovenia. It is located in front of Trnovo Church at the end of Karun Street (Karunova ulica) to the south of the city centre and is a continuation of Emona Street (Emonska cesta). It connects the neighborhoods of Krakovo and Trnovo, the oldest Ljubljana suburbs, known for their market gardens and cultural events. A bridge has stood on the site since the late 17th century. The modern bridge was built between 1928 and 1932 by the constructor Matko Curk upon the plans of the architect Jože Plečnik. It is distinguished by its width and the trees that it bears. It is the most prominent object of Plečnik's renovation of the banks of the Gradaščica. Since August 2021, the Trnovo Bridge has been inscribed as part of Plečnik's legacy on the UNESCO World Heritage List.

== Architecture ==
Bridge arch seen from river level

The iron-concrete bridge, designed as a public space, has a roughly square platform with a width of 20 metres (66 ft). It is supported from below by a stone arch. Each of its corners is capped with a small pyramid, a signature motif of Plečnik's, designed in the same way as the spires of the church. The mid-span features a pair of Art-Deco male sculptures. The bridge is among the rare with live trees. Two rows of birches divide the pedestrian and vehicle lanes, intentionally obscuring the bridge silhouette. They are complemented by a balustrade of vase-like elements and a row of short columns at each side. There is also a statue of Saint John the Baptist, the patron of the church, at the center of the bridge. It was designed by Nikolaj Pirnat. On the opposite side stands a slender obelisk with a lamp. It has been dedicated to Sigmund Zois, a naturalist and patron of science and arts. On the Krakovo side, a stone tablet with the inscription KRAKOVU 'to Krakovo' is mounted on the face of the bridge. On the Trnovo side, there is a stone tablet that reads TRNOVU 'to Trnovo'.
