= St. Michael's Church (Črna Vas) =

Catholic church in Slovenia

- Cerkev sv. Mihaela

Religion
- Affiliation: Roman Catholic
- Diocese: Archdiocese of Ljubljana
- Ecclesiastical or organisational status: Cathedral
- Year consecrated: 1940

Location
- Location: Črna Vas, Slovenia
- Interactive map of St. Michael's Church
- Coordinates: 46°00′44.49″N 14°30′21.26″E

Architecture
- Architect: Jože Plečnik
- Type: Church
- Completed: 1939

Specifications
- Length: 23.30 m (76.4 ft)
- Width: 13.30 m (43.6 ft)
- Spire: 1
- Materials

UNESCO World Heritage Site
- Type: Cultural
- Criteria: iv
- Designated: 2021 (44th session)
- Part of: The works of Jože Plečnik in Ljubljana – Human Centred Urban Design
- Reference no.: 1643
- Region: Europe and North America

Website
- www.zupnijabarje.si/plecnikova-cerkev-sv-mihaela.html

St. Michael's Church in Črna Vas, Slovenia, also known as St. Michael's Church in the Marsh (Slovene: Cerkev sv. Mihaela na Barju), is a parish church of the Latin Church of the Catholic Church in the Archdiocese of Ljubljana. Dedicated to Saint Michael, it is one of the prominent works of 20th-century Slovenian architect Jože Plečnik, and is listed as a monument of national significance of Slovenia. The church, together with several other Plečnik's works in Ljubljana, has also been listed as a UNESCO World Heritage Site The works of Jože Plečnik in Ljubljana – Human Centred Urban Design in 2021.

== History ==
The church was commissioned on behalf of Trnovo parish, with support of the parish priest and writer Fran Saleški Finžgar. In 1922, Finžgar asked his neighbour Plečnik to prepare some plans for the church. The task proved challenging due to the soft ground of the Ljubljana Marsh. Initial plans were scrapped due to extensive floods and economic recession in the 1920s, however, Plečnik prepared new plans in 1935. Finžgar retired in 1936 and the organizational tasks were taken over by Karel Matkovič, Plečnik's nephew. Following some initial disagreements with local landowners, the construction begun in 1937.

The construction site specifics called for some innovative solutions by Plečnik. The soft ground required the church to be built on supports rammed into the mud. In addition, the bell-tower was constructed separately from the main building and its weight was reduced by arched openings. The church aisle itself is elevated, with a staircase leading to it. The basement is occupied by classrooms and the priest's living quarters. Due to budget constraints, Plečnik used local materials, such as the stone from the nearby Podpeč quarry and timber, donated by the locals. Plečnik only used stone for the central part and for the four corners, while he used concrete sewer pipes and timber to fill in the empty spaces. He also used concrete roof tiles. The church was completed in 1939 and consecrated in 1940 by Ljubljana's Bishop Gregorij Rožman.

The sanctuary has an unusual orientation:the altar is placed on the longer side of the nave, thereby reducing the distance between the priest and the church-goers. This is the approach that Plečnik also took at the St. Francis's Church in Ljubljana. With the main altar placed almost in the centre, Plečnik preceded the principles set by the Second Vatican Council by several decades, bringing a new design to the sanctuary.
