= Črna Vas =

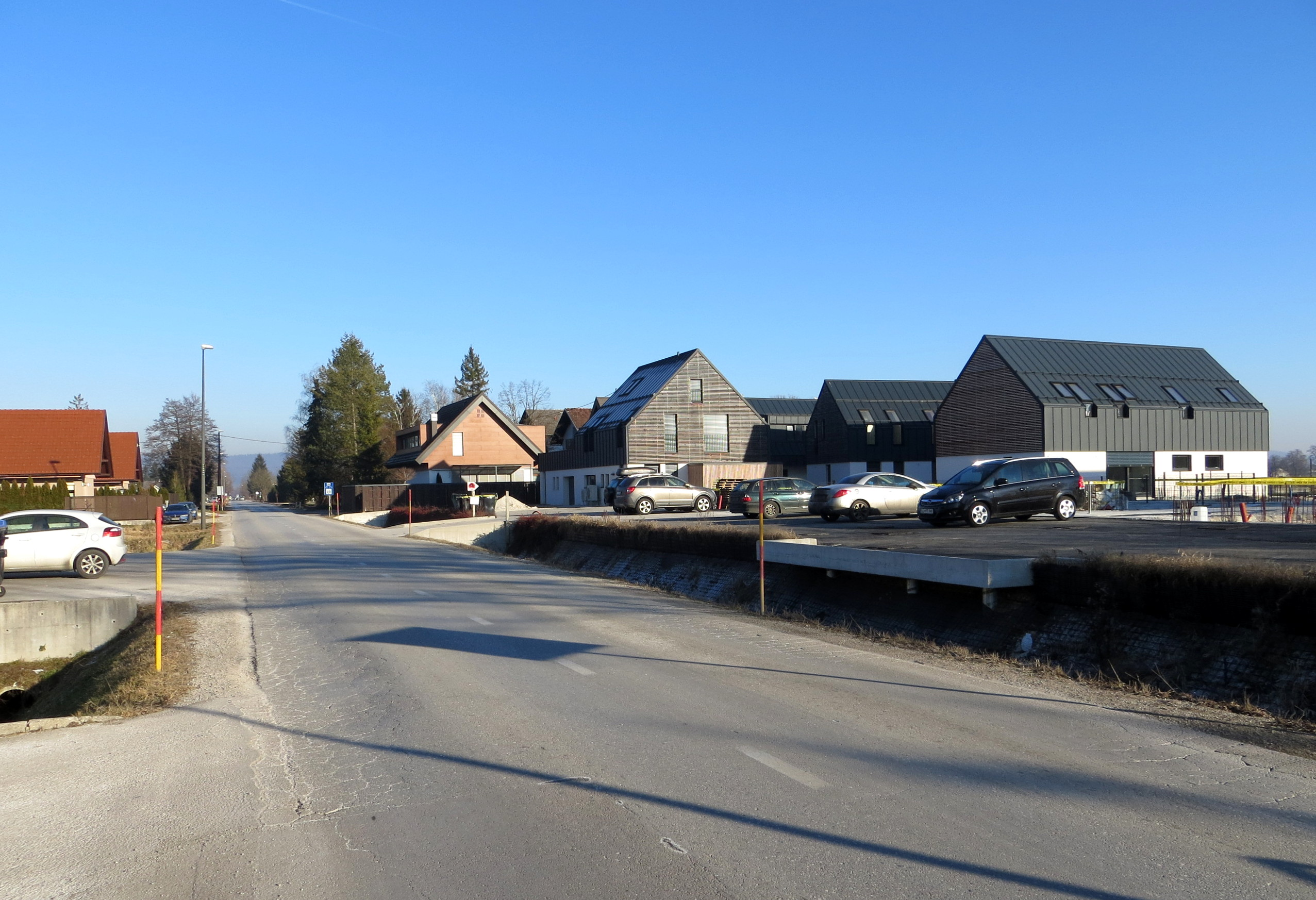

- Location in Slovenia
- Coordinates: 46°0′12.33″N 14°29′0.25″E
- Country: Slovenia
- Traditional region: Lower Carniola
- Statistical region: Central Slovenia
- Municipality: Ljubljana

Area
  - Total: 5.07 km^{2} (1.96 sq mi)
- Elevation: 286.3 m (939 ft)

Population (2012)
  - Total: 856
  - Density: 169/km^{2} (440/sq mi)
- Postal code: 1000

Črna Vas (pronounced [ˈtʃəɾna ˈʋaːs]; Slovene: Črna vas) is a settlement on the right bank of the Ljubljanica River, south of the capital Ljubljana in central Slovenia. It belongs to the City Municipality of Ljubljana. It is part of the traditional region of Lower Carniola and is now included with the rest of the municipality in the Central Slovenia Statistical Region.

== Geography ==
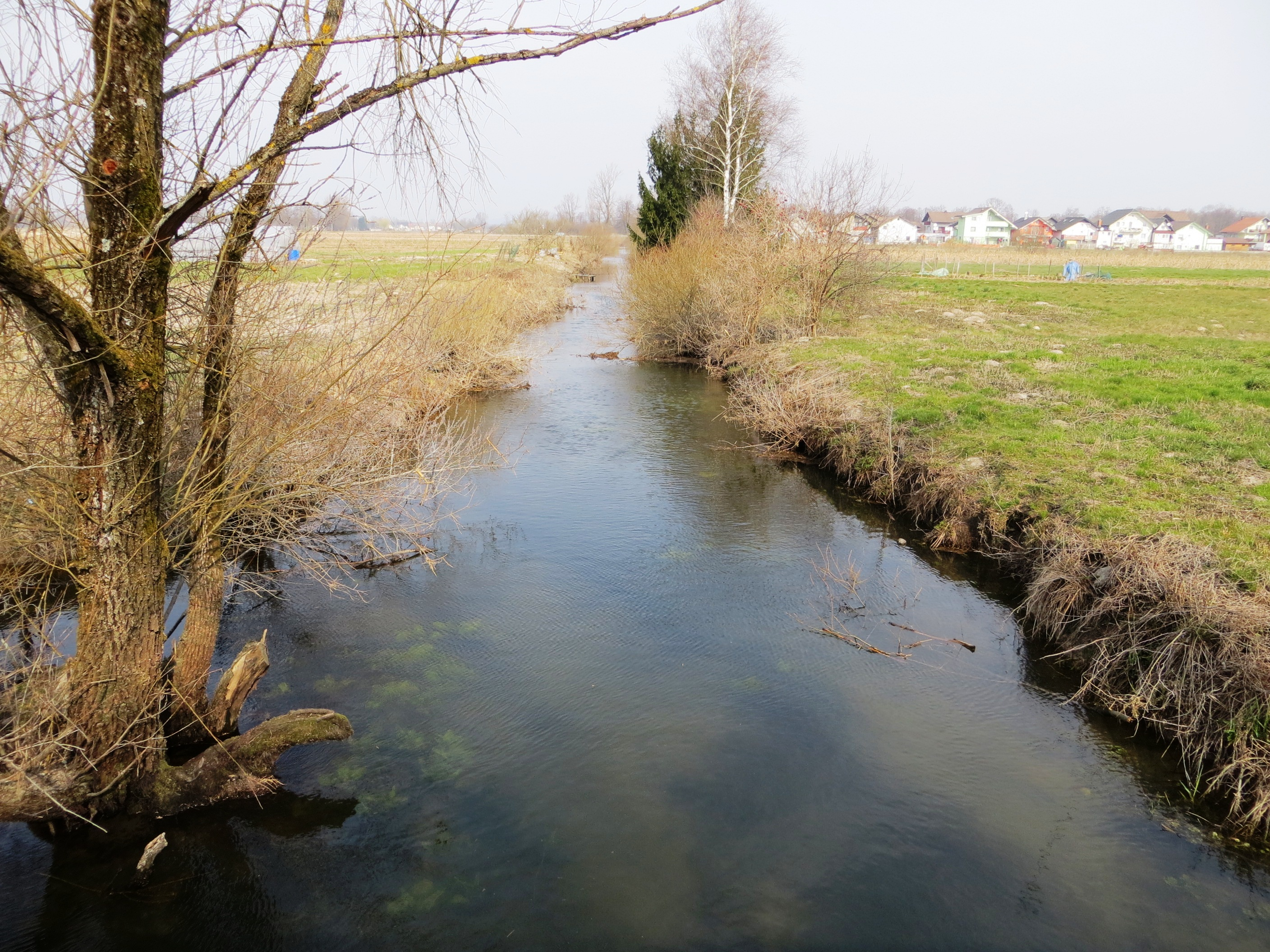
Farjevec Creek

Črna Vas is a ribbon village south of the Ljubljanica River along the road from Ljubljana to Podpeč. It is bounded to the east by Farjevec Creek and extends west nearly to Drobtinka Creek. The Iška River cuts north through the territory of the settlement west of the main population center. Other watercourses in the settlement include Vala Creek, Capuder Creek, Zidar Creek (Slovene: Zidarjev graben), and Salček Creek (Slovene: Salčkov graben), which function as drainage canals for the surrounding farmland. There are tilled fields along the road and meadows behind them. The southern part of the settlement is swampier and is affected by annual flooding. The uncut Šotnik peat bog lies next to Farjevec Creek.

== Name ==
The name Črna vas literally means 'black village'. The name is believed to refer to either the black soil of the area found below the peat in the marsh, or more likely to the black color of the traditional wooden houses roofed with peat. The earlier name of the settlement and the surrounding region was Volar; the name Črna vas did not come into use until 1846, and did not become an official name until 1876.

== History ==
The Črna Vas area was inhabited in prehistoric times; traps and a dugout made by pile dwellers were found at the Kozler property. Črna Vas is the oldest settlement in the Ljubljana Marsh. The first houses were built soon after 1830. None of the original houses in the settlement are preserved. The houses were traditionally built of wood and thatched with straw or roofed with peat because stone houses would have been too heavy for the bearing capacity of the soft marsh soil and it was difficult to transport bricks to the area from far away using the poor roads. Masonry and brick houses were built only after all of the peat had been extracted.

== Parish church ==
The parish church in the settlement is dedicated to Saint Michael and is known as Saint Michael in the Marsh (Slovene: Sveti Mihael na Barju). It belongs to the Roman Catholic Archdiocese of Ljubljana. It was designed by the Slovene architect Jože Plečnik and built between 1937 and 1939. Since August 2021, it has been inscribed as part of Plečnik's legacy on the UNESCO World Heritage List.

== Notable people ==
Notable people that were born or lived in Črna Vas include:

- Fran Črnagoj (a.k.a. Frančišek, Franc) (1865–1926), school director and orchard expert
- Anton Melik (1890–1966), geographer
