= Viršle u zemički =

- Type: hot dog
- Place of origin: Serbia
- Invented: 1956

Viršle u zemički was the first fast food to appear in Belgrade. They were introduced to the market by the Agricultural Combine Belgrade (PKB) in mid-1956. Vienna sausage in buns, topped with mustard, were sold at standardized kiosks across the city and very quickly became highly popular. In more recent times, they are often cited as a unique local precursor to the hot dog.

In the beginning, they were blue-and-white wooden kiosks, but later the famous "red kiosks" appeared. Both the kiosk and the hot dogs very quickly became a symbol of Belgrade. It is considered that this gave Belgrade its first "fast-food chain".

== History ==
=== 1950s ===
PKB was the largest company of the socialist era, boasting immense production and food-processing capacities. About a decade after the war ended—in mid-1956—the company's leadership came up with the idea of selling food on the streets. Kiosks where one could buy boiled Vienna saguages with mustard were being set up on Belgrade's streets. These early kiosks were blue and white, made of wood, and not much larger than the ones today that sell newspapers.

=== 1960s ===
Initially, there were only a few of them across Belgrade, with the most famous one located in the park opposite the Hotel Moskva, on the Terazije Terrace. As hot dogs grew in popularity, so did the number of kiosks; by the early 1960s, they could be found at Tašmajdan near the tram turnaround, at Republic Square—close to the current site of the monument to Branislav Nušić—at Savski Trg opposite the former Main Railway Station, and near Studentski Grad in New Belgrade and at other popular gathering spots.

=== 1970s and 1980s ===
A true revolution arrived in the 1970s with the appearance of the now-legendary red kiosk. Throughout the 1970s and 1980s, these became iconic spots in the city. They were bright red, bearing only the words "viršle u zemički" in white lettering; once sales took off, no further advertising was needed. At that time, in addition to standard hot dogs, one could also buy mildly spicy sausages at these red kiosks. Strategically placed throughout the city, they effectively gave Belgrade its first "fast-food chain".

=== 1990s ===
Kiosks were present on the streets of Belgrade until the mid-1980s, however, there is no precise information on exactly when they—along with the famous hot dogs in buns—disappeared. It can be assumed that, over time, they were displaced by competition and the ever-growing variety of street food available for purchase. Their definitive end certainly came during the 1990s, when the very state of which they were, in a sense, a symbol also ceased to exist.

=== Red kiosks ===
In 1967, a competition was launched for the "Belgrade Kiosk"—a small structure designed to serve as a retail unit. The competition was won by the young Slovenian designer Saša Mächtig with his "K67" project (K for kiosk, 67 for the year it was designed). The kiosk based on his design was patented that same year. It soon became one of the symbols of Yugoslavia. The design was considered so revolutionary that it was even exhibited at the Museum of Modern Art (MoMA) in New York. The units could be installed individually or combined into larger compositions, and they were offered in various colors, such as blue, white, yellow, and red. PKB decided to house its "takeaway food" in these kiosks.

That is how red kiosks flooded Belgrade in the early 1970s. Although they later appeared in other colors as well, Mächtig's original idea was for them to be red "so they would be visible from afar.".

== In popular culture ==
Many Belgraders still remember the red kiosks and hot dogs in buns, and red kiosks bearing the sign "viršle u zemički" are increasingly being seen on Belgrade's streets again. While the kiosk itself remains the same—and has returned to the public spotlight in recent years—the hot dogs themselves are not the same. Through this approach, food vendors aim to attract customers by evoking nostalgia for times gone by. One such kiosk has been set up in front of the Rajićeva shopping center. The more creative ones even came up with the "hot-dog-mobile"—specialized, kiosk-like vehicles, also red in color. Belgrade City Museum owns similar kiosk and occasionally, it can be seen on the streets of Belgrade as a tourist attraction.
