= Kiosk =

Historic garden pavilion, modern small booth offering goods

Historically, a kiosk (from Persian کوشک, kušk) was a small garden pavilion open on some or all sides common in Persia, the Indian subcontinent, and in the Ottoman Empire from the 13th century onward. Today, several examples of this type of kiosk still exist in and around the Topkapı Palace in Istanbul, and they can be seen in Balkan countries.

The word is used in English-speaking countries for small booths offering goods and services. In Australia they usually offer food service. Freestanding computer terminals dispensing information are called interactive kiosks.

== Etymology ==
Etymological data points to the Middle Persian word kōšk 'palace, portico' as the origin, via Turkish köşk 'pavilion' and French kiosque or Italian chiosco.

== History and origins ==
A kiosk is an open summer-house or pavilion usually having its roof supported by pillars with screened or totally open walls. As a building type, it was first introduced by the Sasanid and the next used as a small building attached to the main mosque from Seljuks, which consisted of a domed hall with open arched sides. This architectural concept gradually evolved into a small yet grand residence used by Ottoman sultans, the most famous examples of which are quite possibly the Tiled Kiosk ("Çinili Köşk" in Turkish) and Baghdad Kiosk ("Bağdat Köşkü" in Turkish). The former was built in 1473 by Mehmed II ("the Conqueror") at the Topkapı Palace, Istanbul, and consists of a two storey building topped with a dome and having open sides overlooking the gardens of the palace. The Baghdad Koshk was also built at the Topkapı Palace in 1638–39, by Sultan Murad IV. The building is again domed, offering direct views onto the gardens and park of the Palace as well as the architecture of the city of Istanbul.

Sultan Ahmed III (1703–1730) also built a glass room of the Sofa Kiosk at the Topkapı Palace incorporating some Western elements, such as the gilded brazier designed by Duplessis père, which was given to the Ottoman ambassador by King Louis XV of France.

The first English contact with Turkish Kiosk came through Lady Mary Wortley Montagu (1689–1762), the wife of the English ambassador to Istanbul, who in a letter written on 1 April 1717 to Anne Thistlethwayte, mentions a "chiosk" describing it as "raised by 9 or 10 steps and enclosed with gilded lattices".

European monarchs adopted the building type. Stanisław Leszczyński, king of Poland and father-in-law of Louis XV, built kiosks for himself based on his memories of his captivity in Turkey. These kiosks were used as garden pavilions serving coffee and beverages but later were converted into band stands and tourist information stands decorating most European gardens, parks and high streets.

Conservatories were in the form of corridors connecting the Pavilion to the stables and consisting of a passage of flowers covered with glass and linked with orangery, a greenhouse, an aviary, a pheasantry and hothouses. The influence of Muslim and Islamo-Indian forms appears clearly in these buildings and particularly in the pheasantry where its higher part is an adaptation of the kiosks found on the roof of Allahabad Palace, as illustrated by Thomas Daniell. Today's conservatories incorporate many elements of Islamic architecture, although modern art forms have shifted from the classical art forms that were used in earlier times.

== Small shops and cafés ==
In the Western Hemisphere and in English-speaking countries, a kiosk is also a booth with an open window on one side. Some vendors operate from kiosks (see mall kiosk), selling small, inexpensive consumables such as newspapers, magazines, lighters, street maps, cigarettes, live and frozen fishing bait and confections.

In Australia, the word is commonly used for small buildings that are used to dispense mainly take-away food and drinks, on beaches, in shopping arcades or in parks. Since the 21st century, many of these have been upgraded and serve fancier food and barista-made coffee.

An information kiosk (or information booth) dispenses free information in the form of maps, pamphlets, and other literature, and/or advice offered by an attendant.

== Interactive kiosks ==
An electronic kiosk (or computer kiosk or interactive kiosk) houses a computer terminal that often employs custom kiosk software designed to function while preventing users from accessing system functions. Indeed, kiosk mode describes such a mode of software operation. Computerized kiosks may store data locally, or retrieve it from a computer network. Some computer kiosks provide a free, informational public service, while others serve a commercial purpose (see mall kiosk). Touchscreens, trackballs, computer keyboards, and pushbuttons are all typical input devices for interactive computer kiosks. Touchscreen kiosks are commercially used as industrial appliances, reducing lines, eliminating paper, improving efficiency and service. Their uses are unlimited from refrigerators to airports, health clubs, movie theaters and libraries.

== Kiosks around the world ==
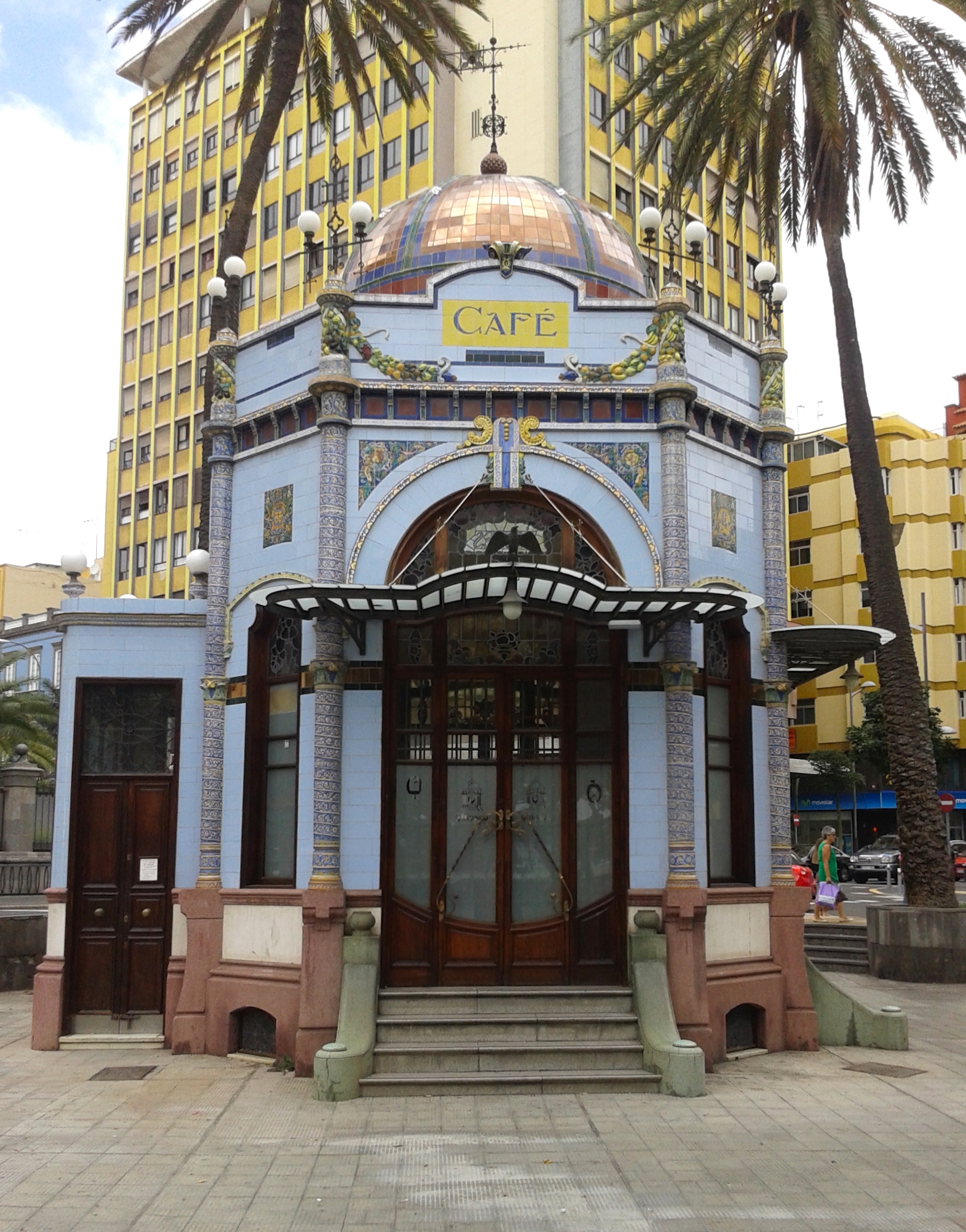
Late Art Nouveau kiosk (1923) in Las Palmas de Gran Canaria

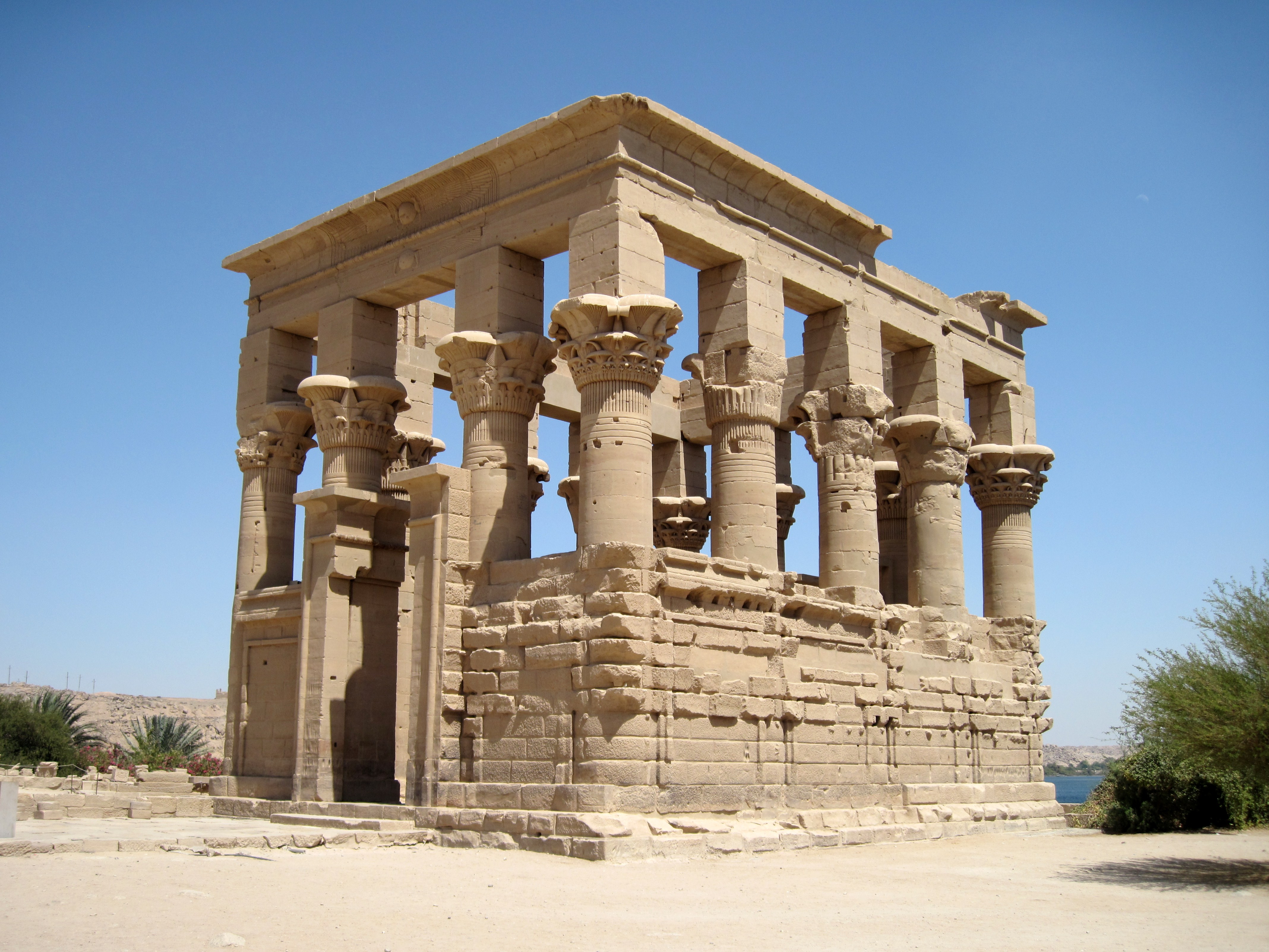
Trajan's Kiosk from 1st century BC on Agilika island, Egypt

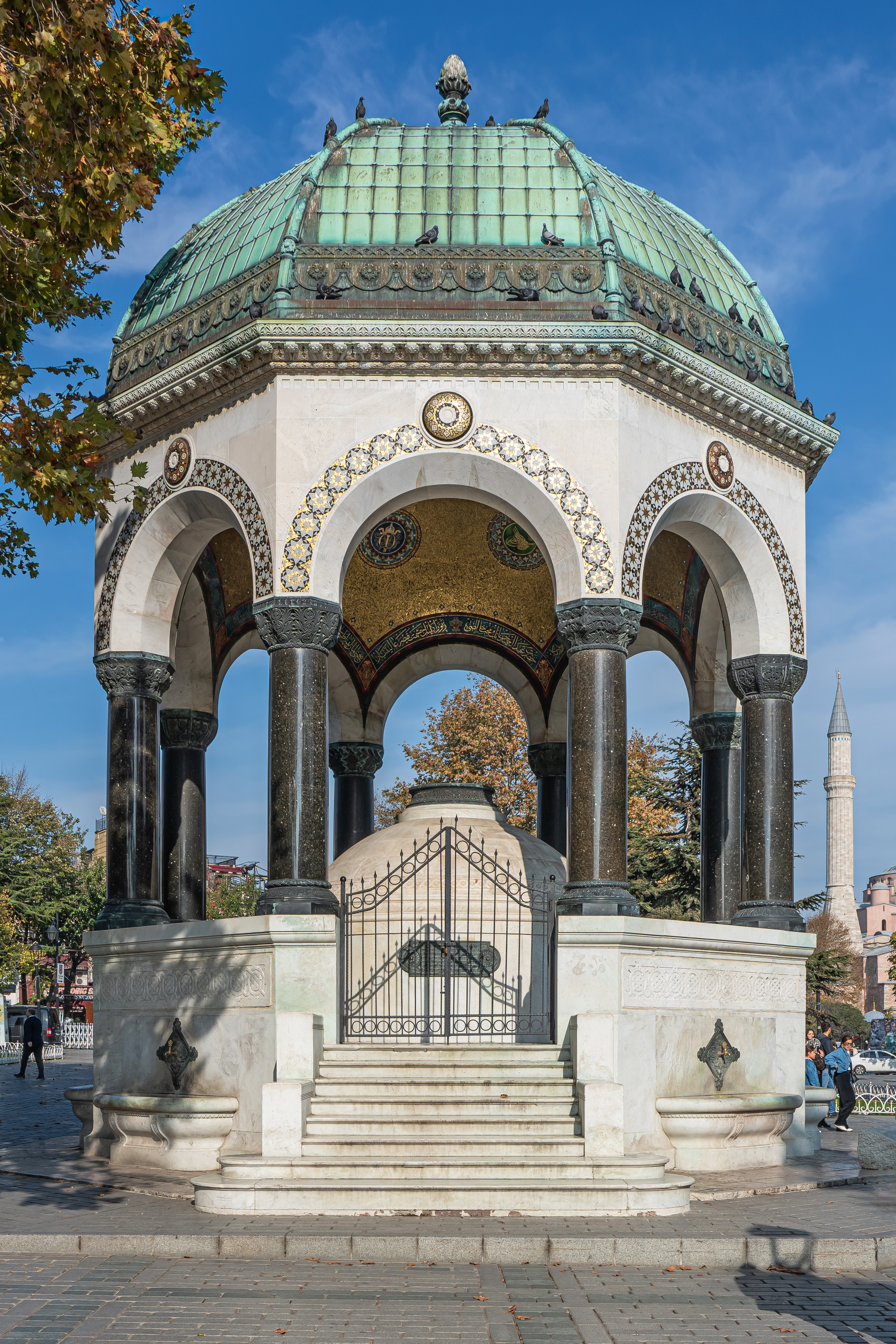
The German Fountain at the Hippodrome of Istanbul

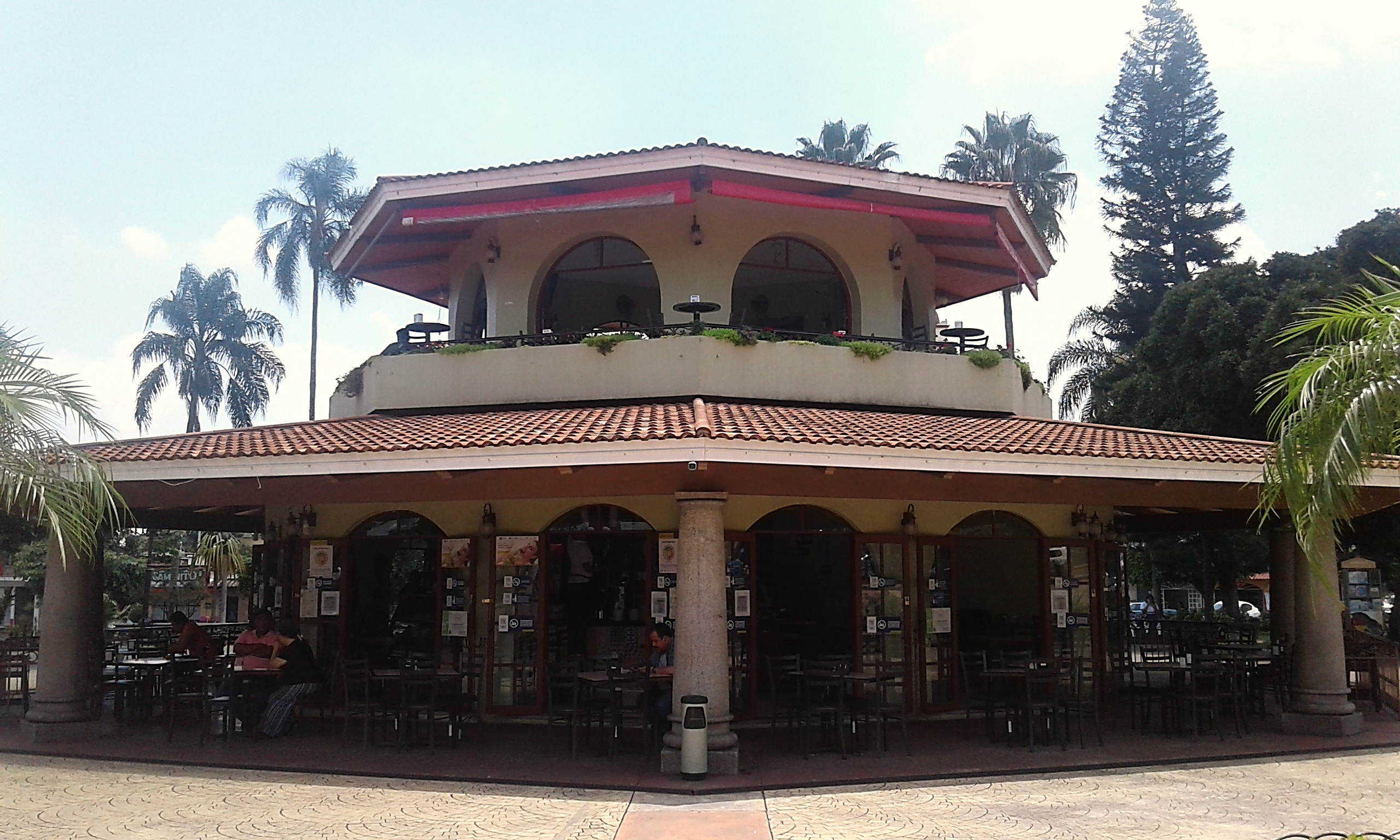
Fortín's Kiosk, México

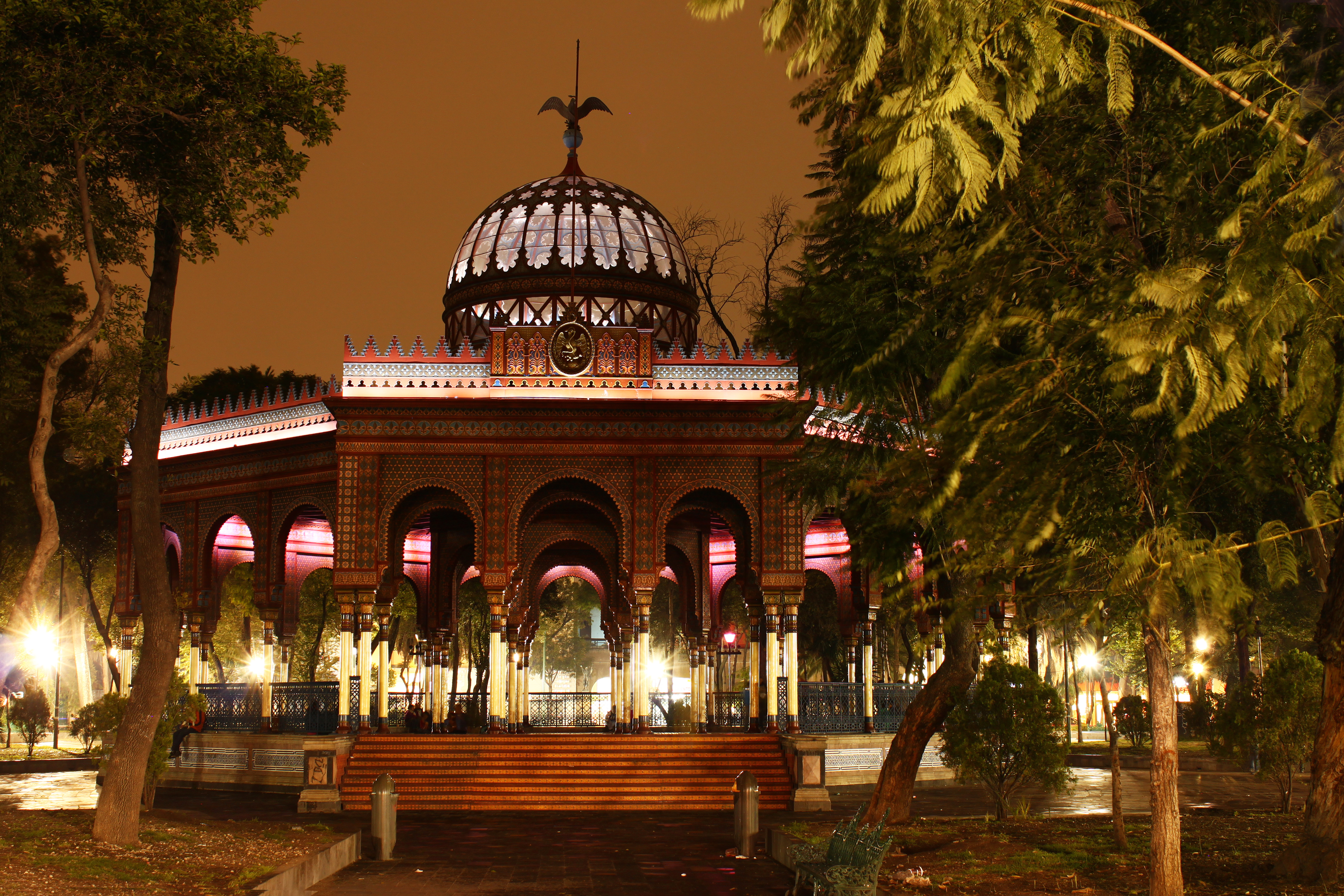
Morisco Kiosk in Mexico

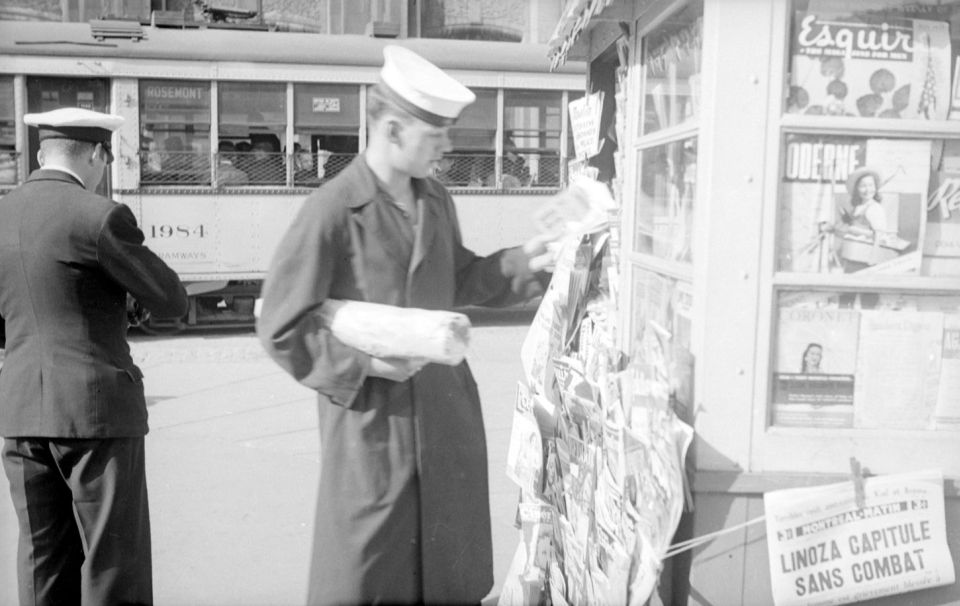
Newsstand in Rosemont, Montreal, 1943

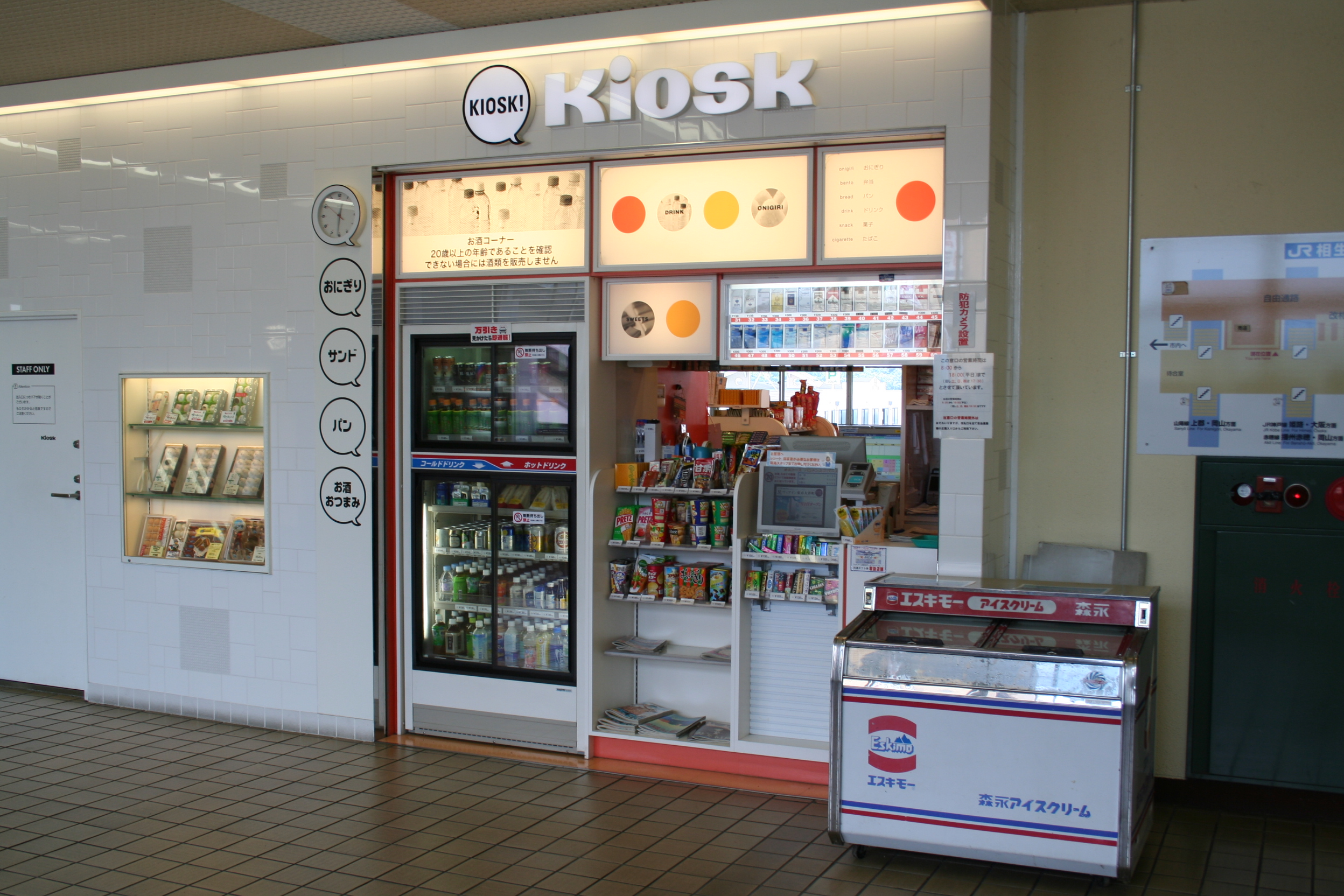
Modern vending kiosk in a train station in Hyogo, Japan

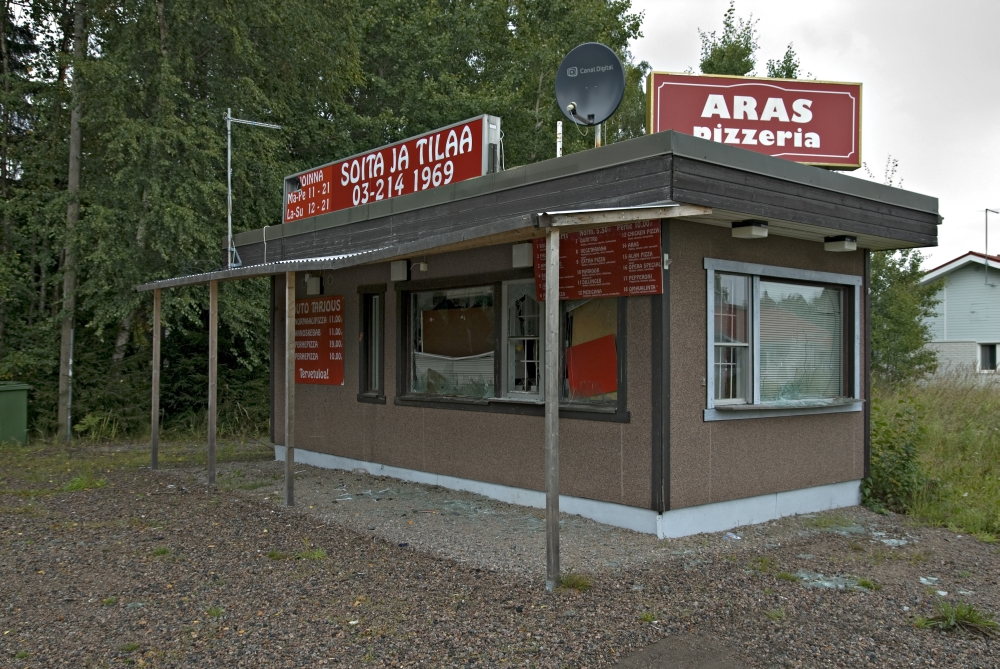
A small kebab serving kiosk in Metsäkylä, Ylöjärvi, Finland

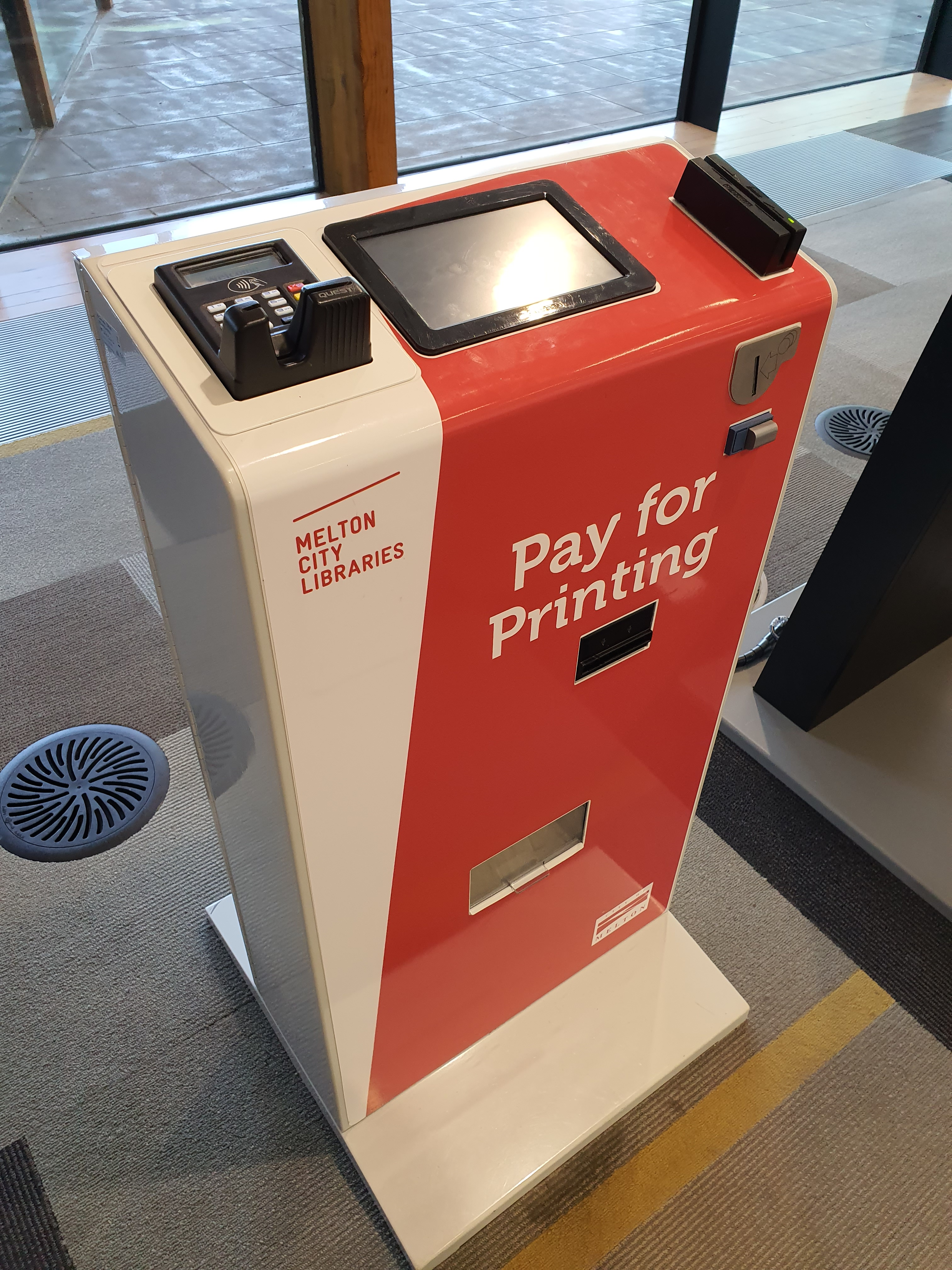
Kiosk self service payment for printing as library service

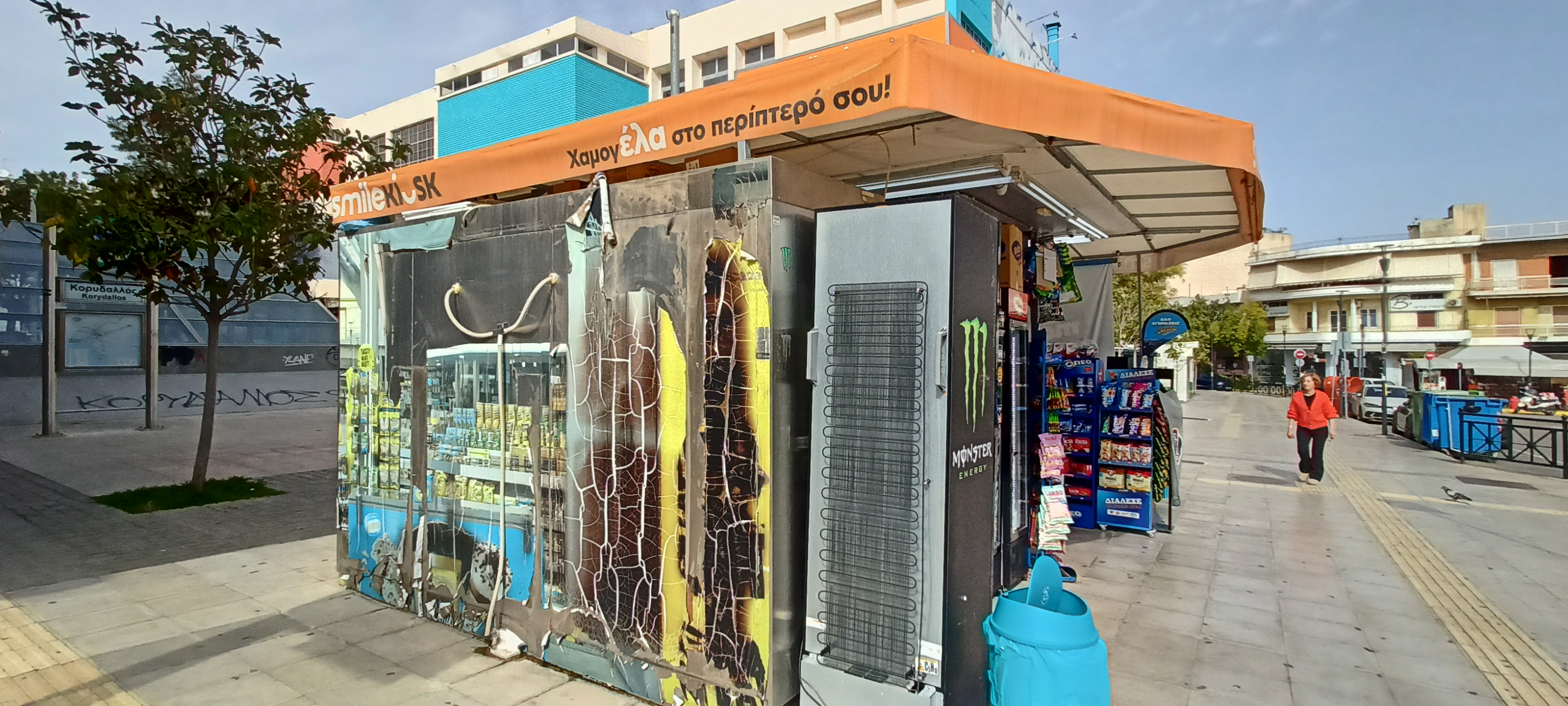
A Kiosk in Athens, Greece

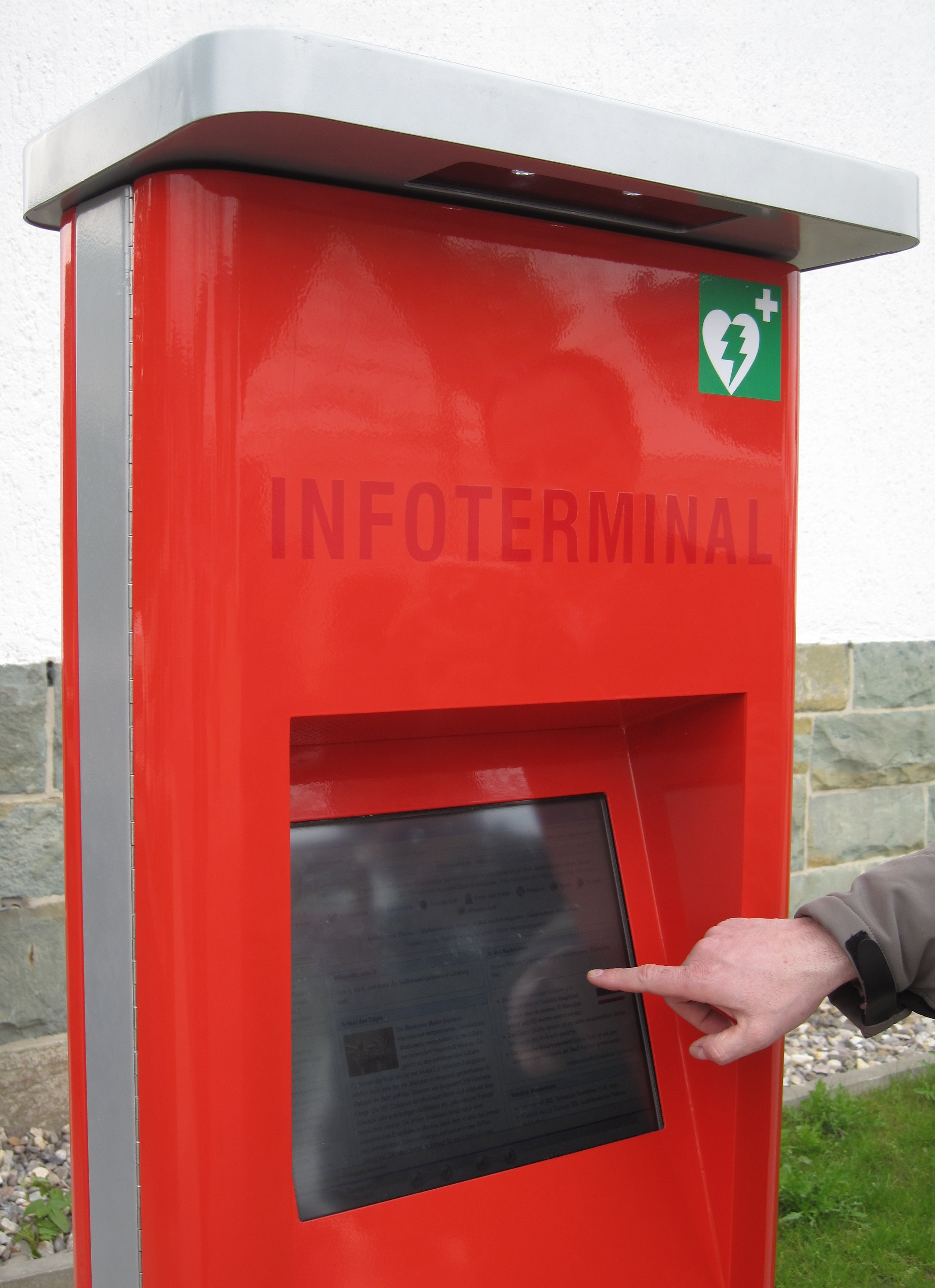
An Internet kiosk in Hemer, Germany

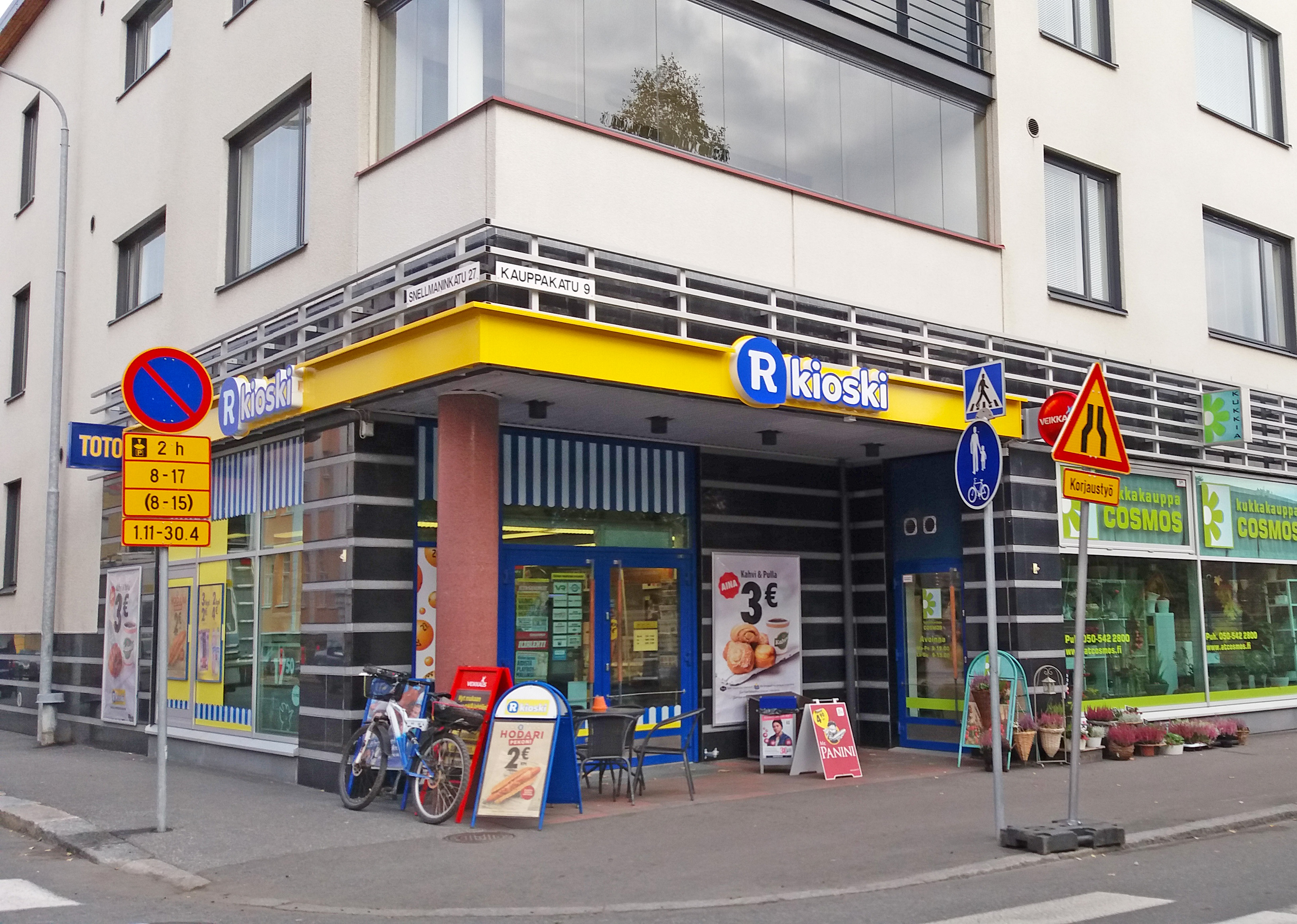
One of the R-Kioski chain stores in Kuopio, Finland

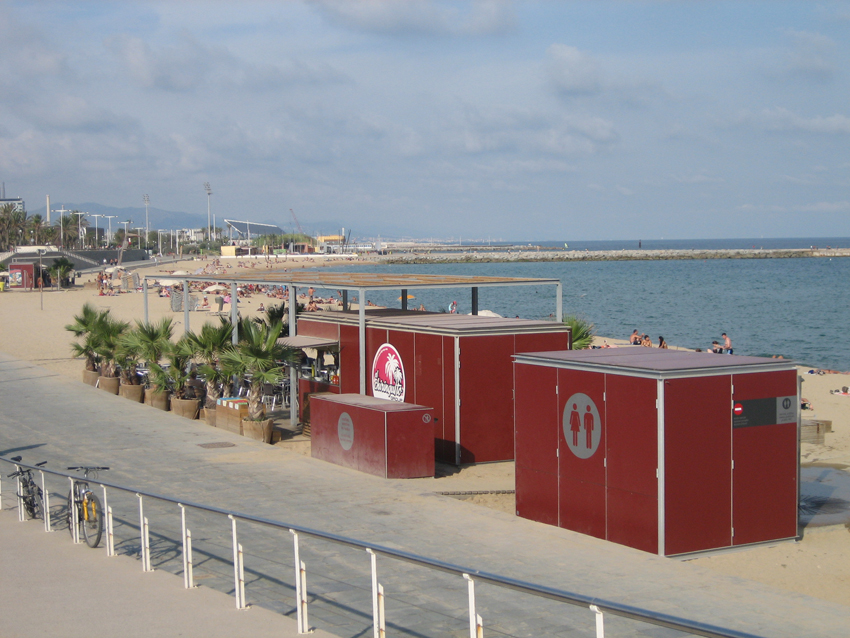
Prefabricated kiosks set for different uses on the beaches of Barcelona, Spain

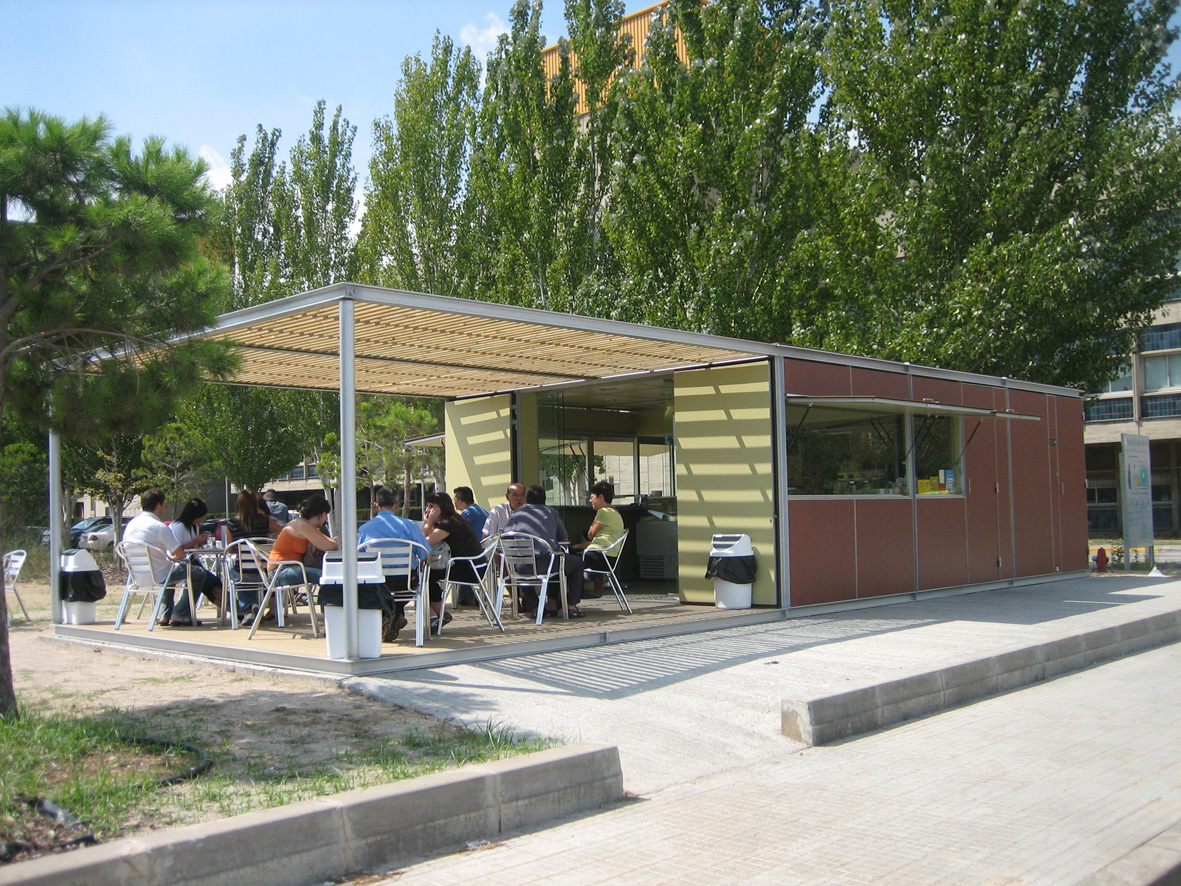
A kiosk with terrace in a park in Barcelona, Spain

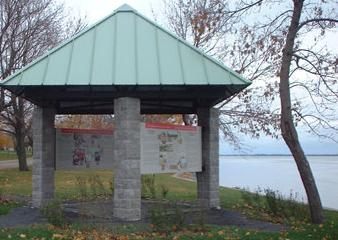
Royal Military College of Canada information kiosk

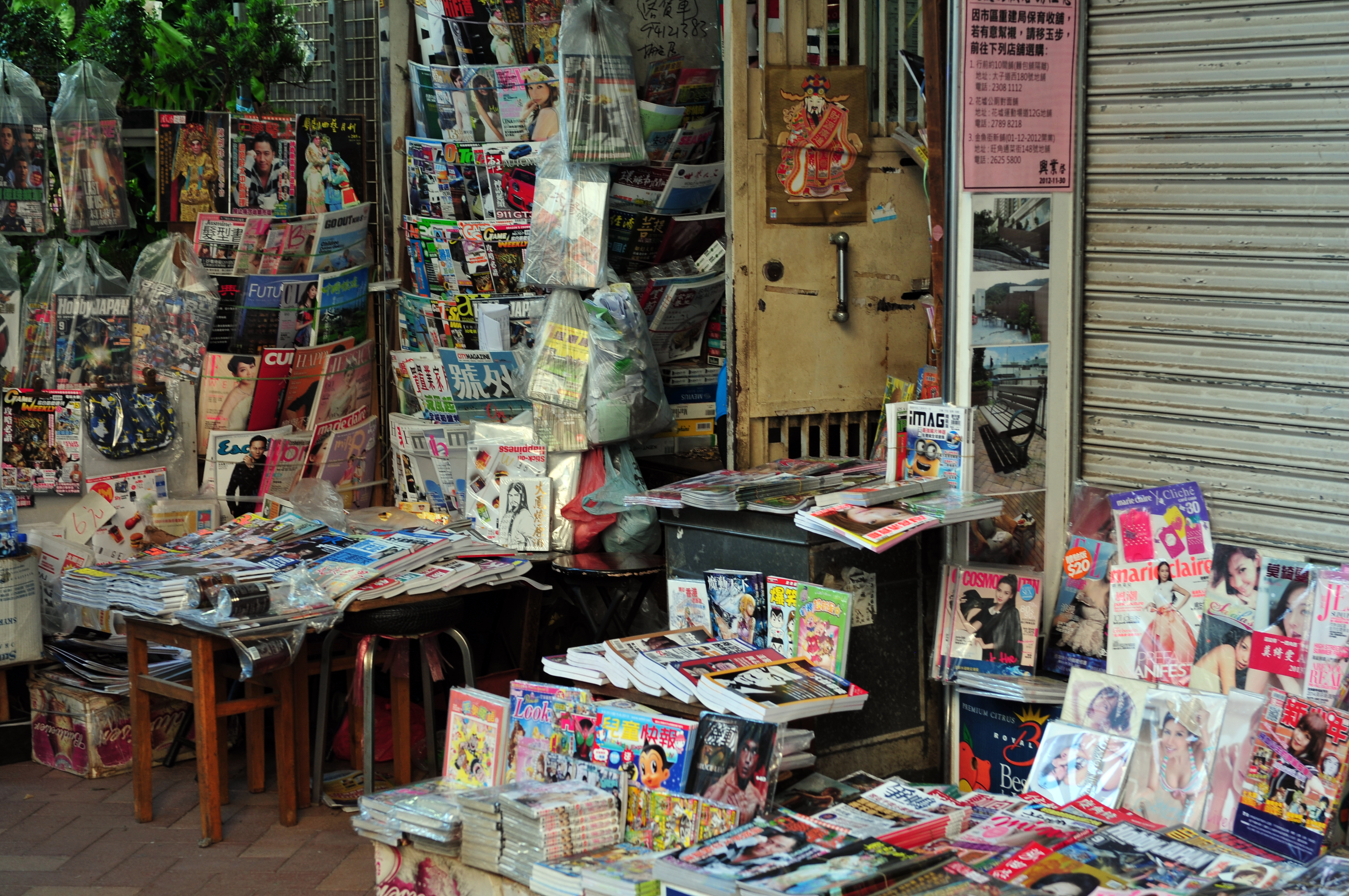
Newsstand in Hong Kong

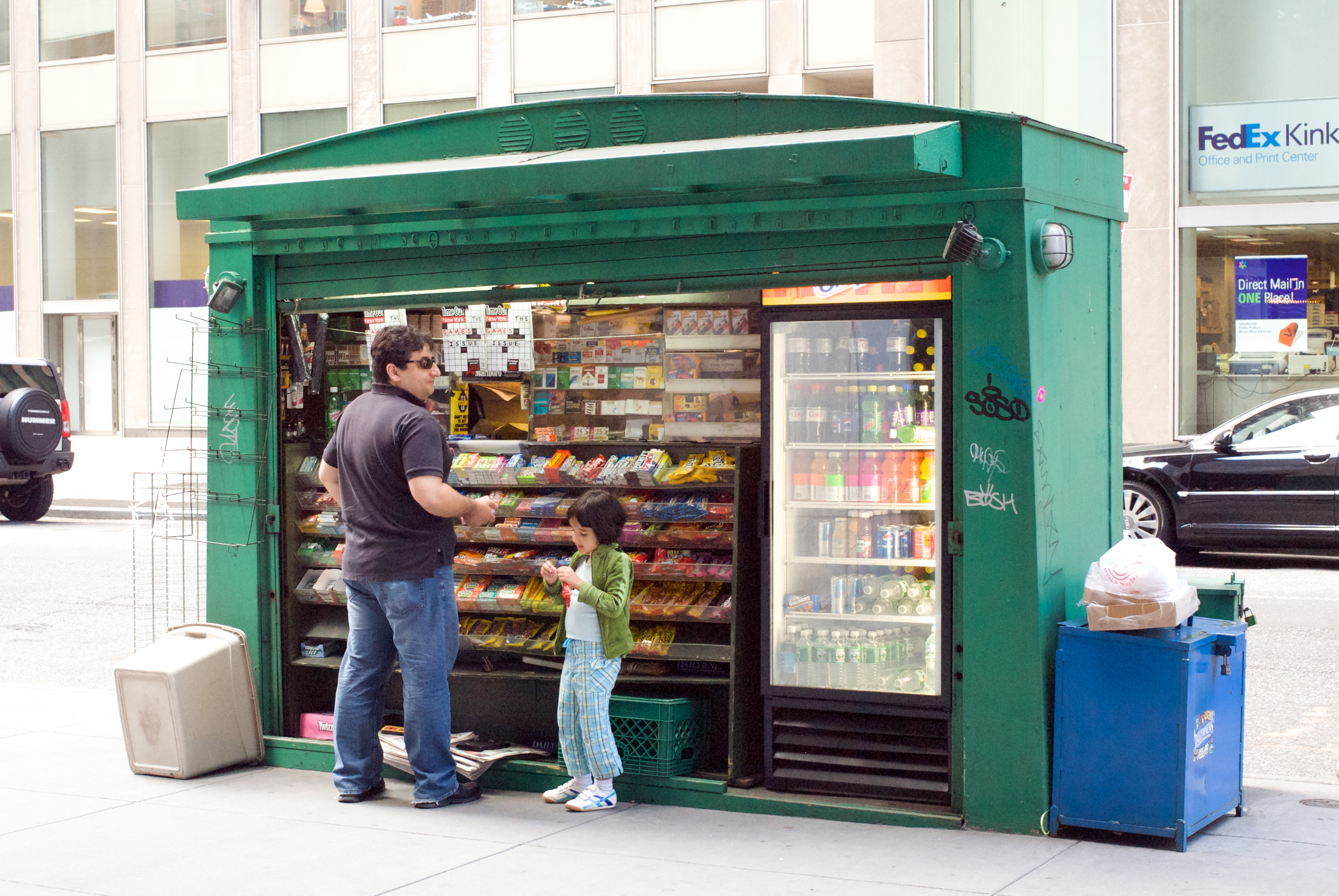
Newsstand in New York City, 2007

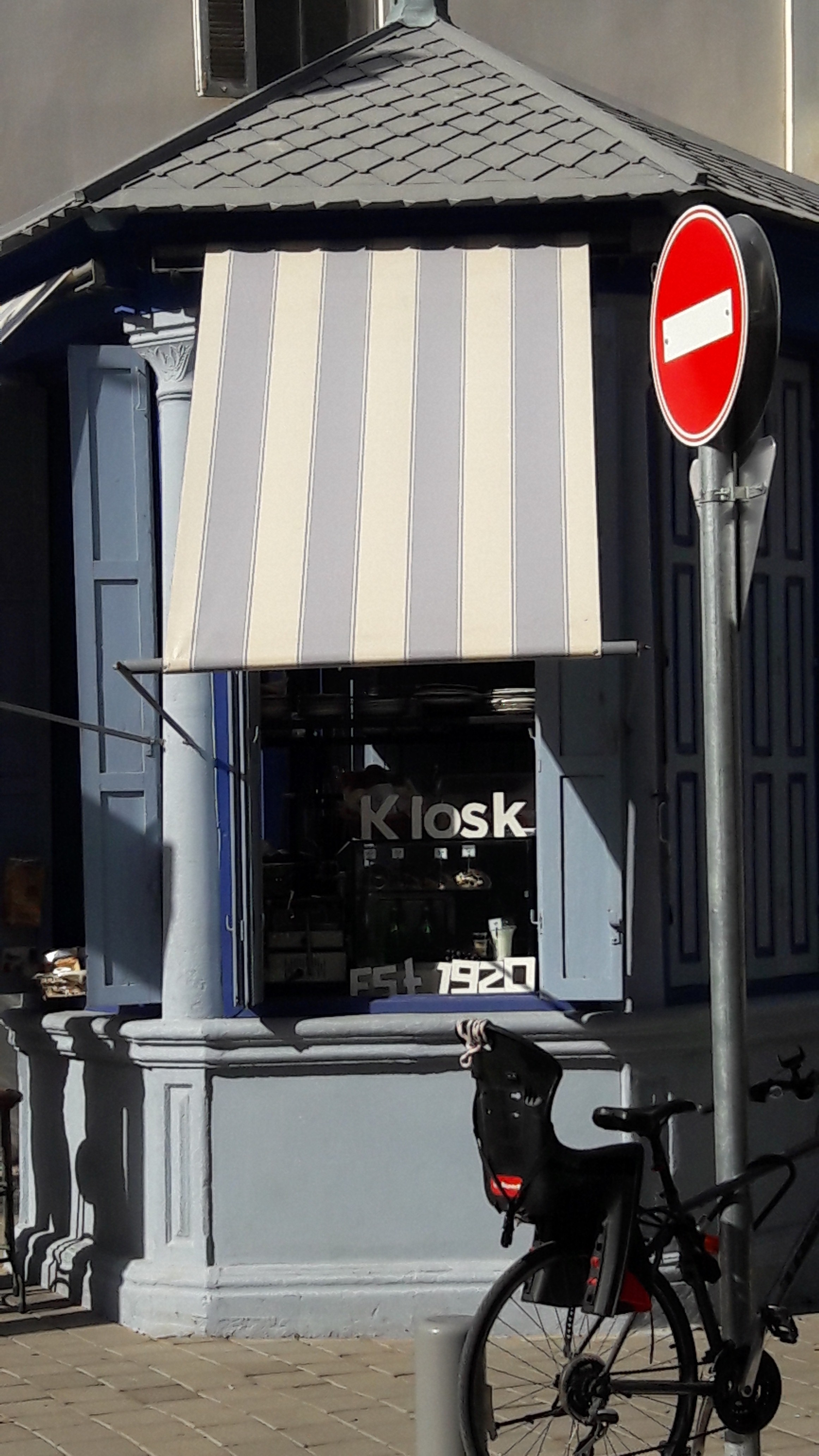
A renovated kiosk in Tel Aviv, Israel

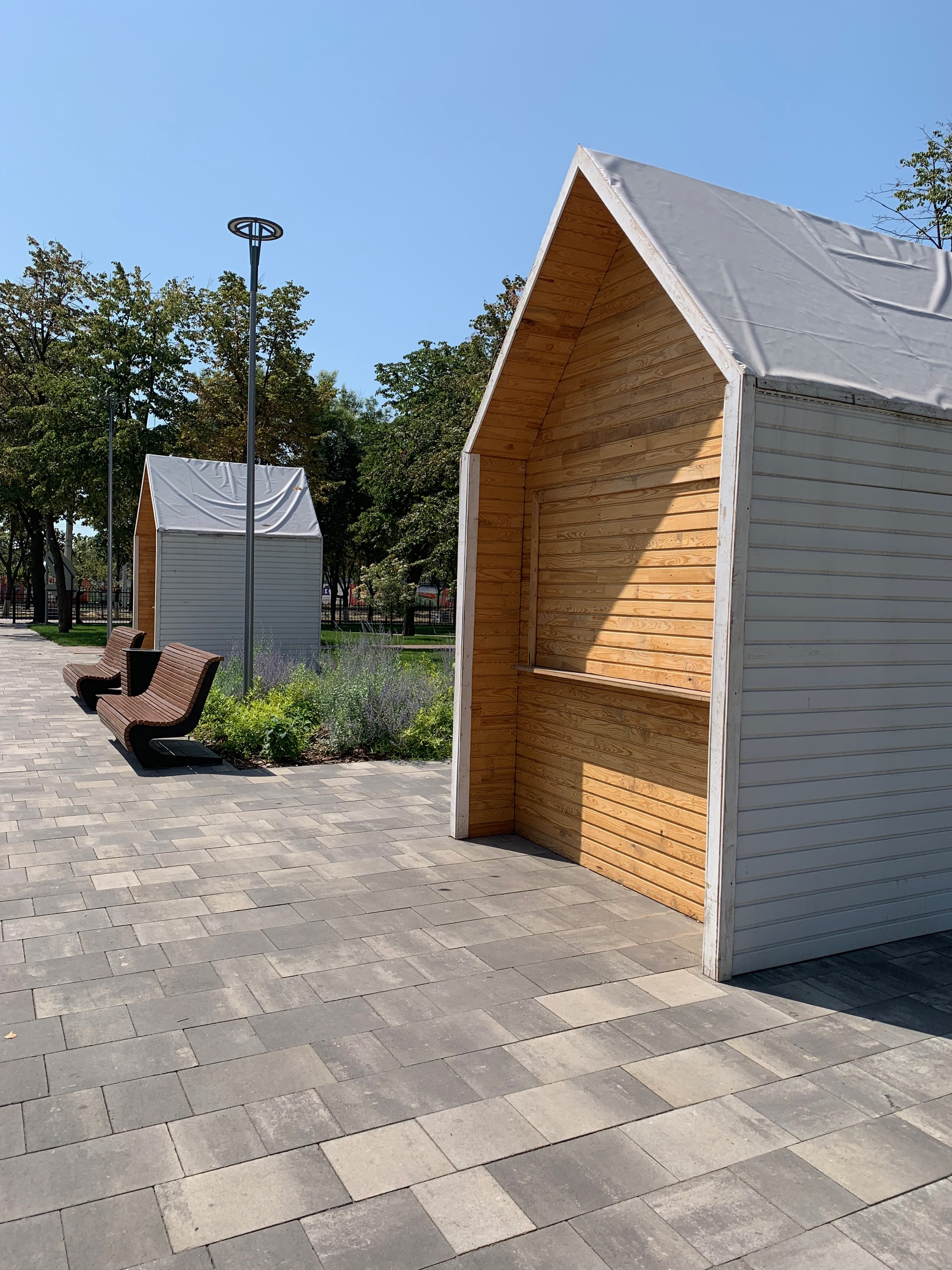
New kiosk in Mariupol, Ukraine

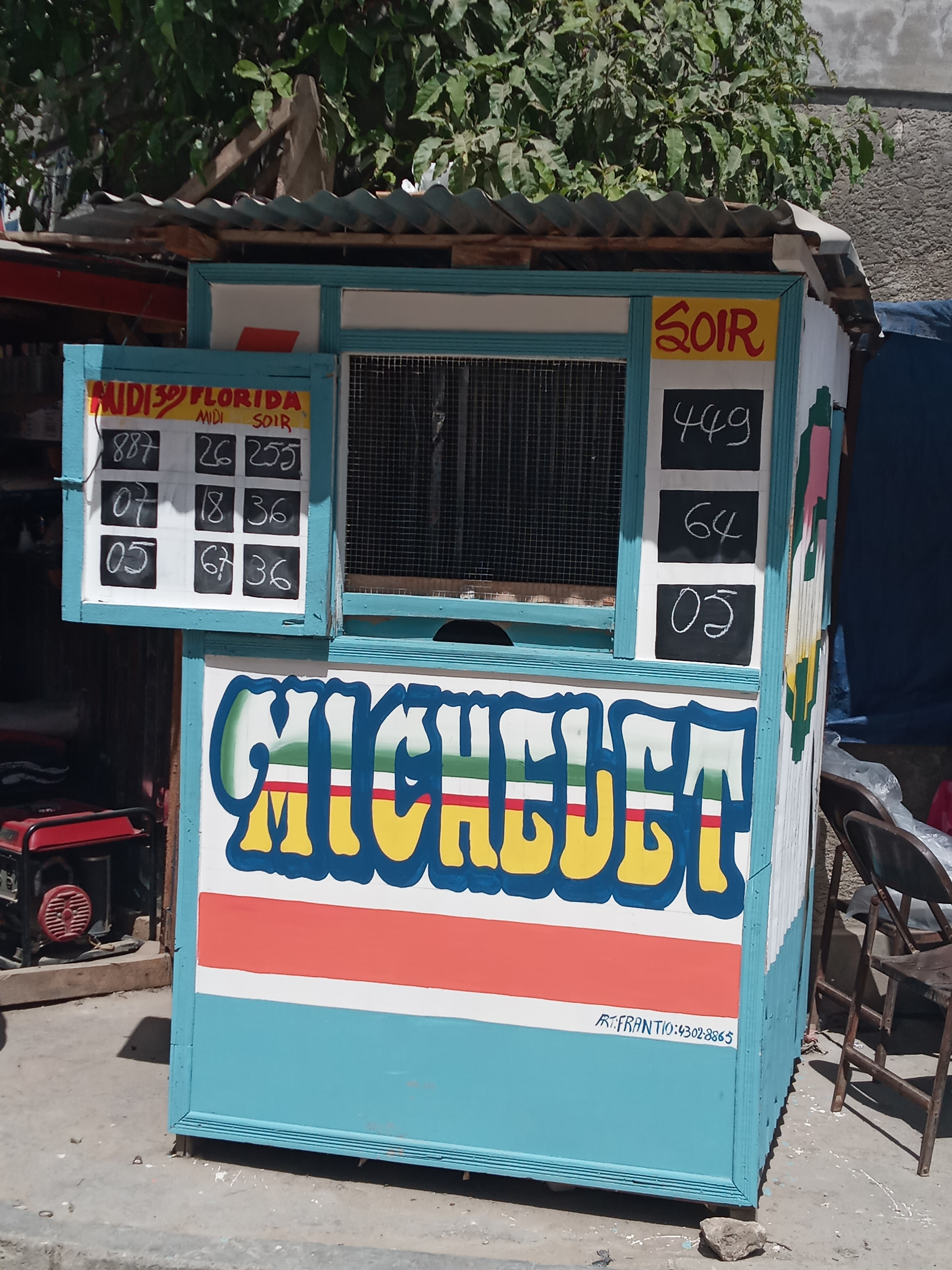
Ti bòlèt in Haiti

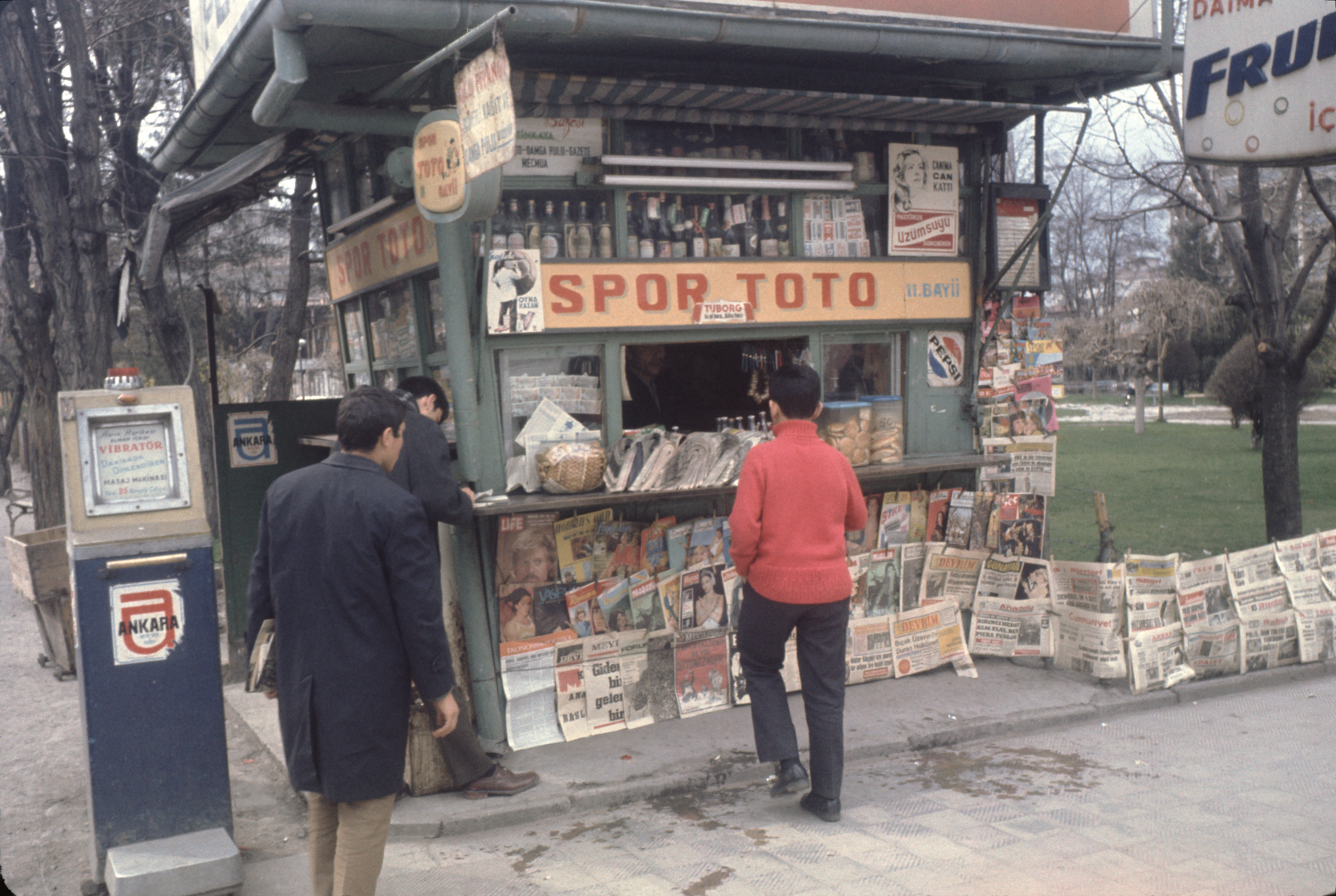
Ankara circa 1969

A Kiosk in Lisbon

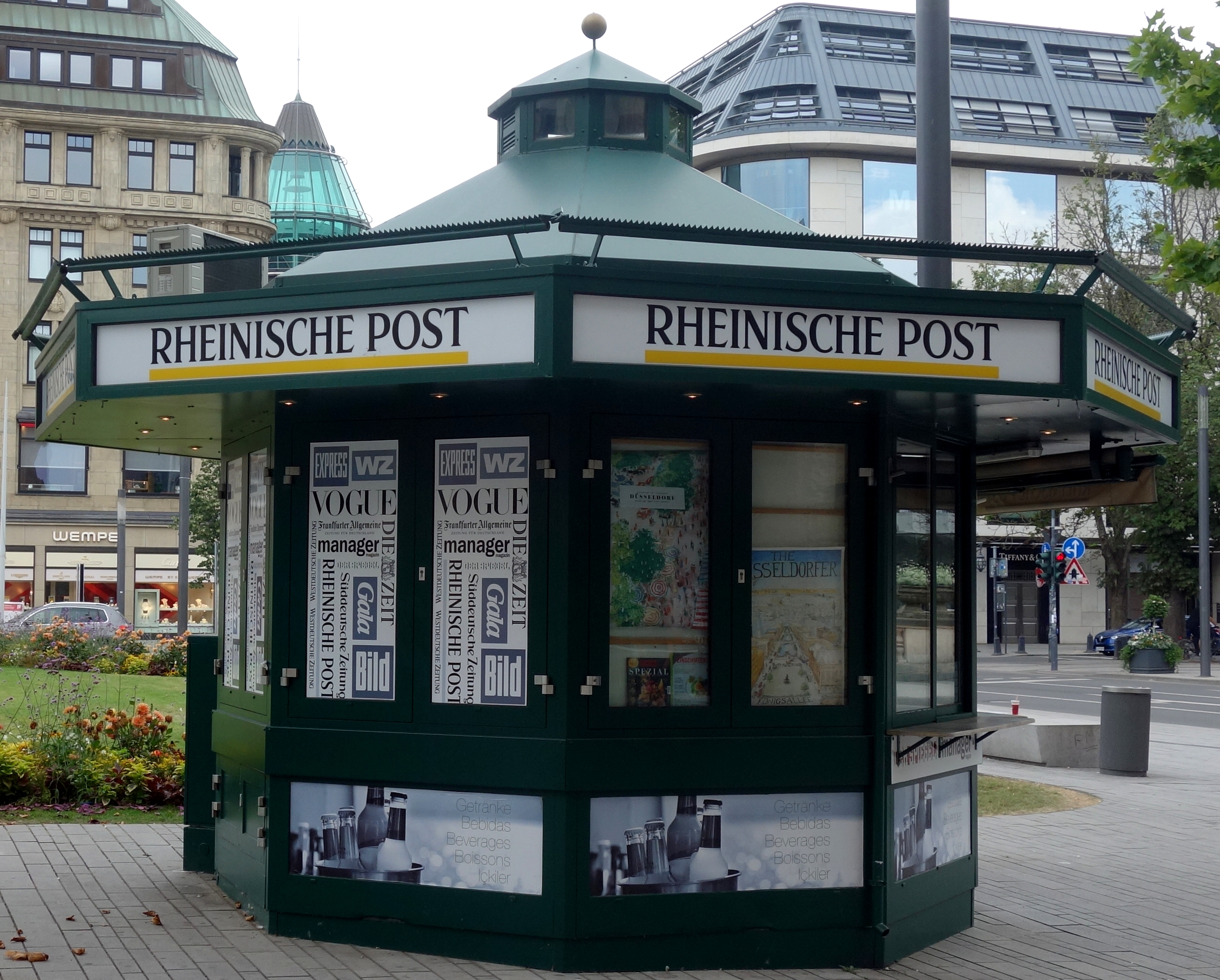
Newsstand in Düsseldorf, Germany

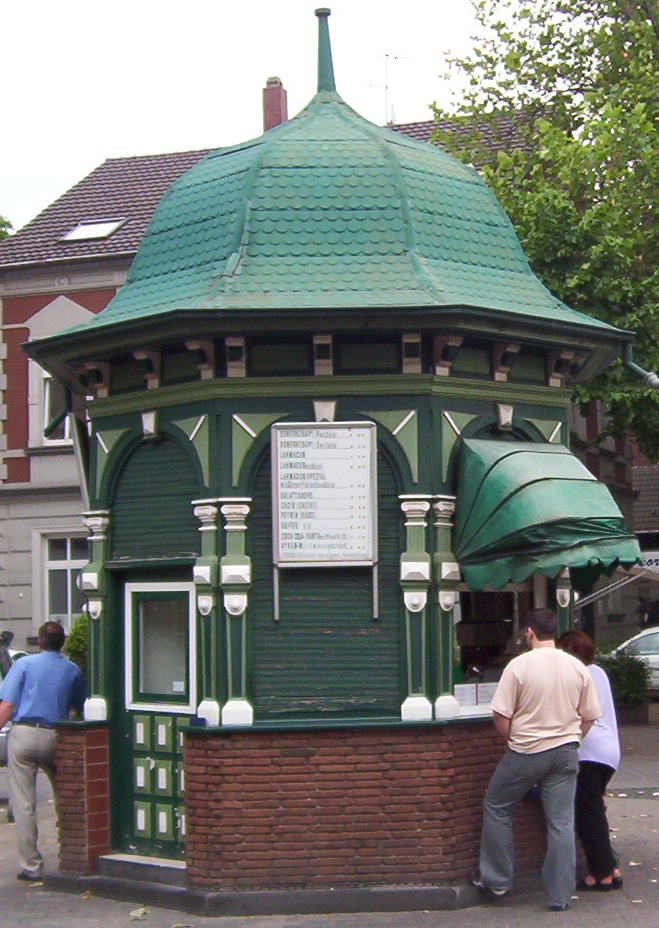
Kiosk in Duisburg-Hamborn, Germany (1890)

== See also ==
- K67 kiosk
- Automated retail
- Automated teller machine
- Bandstand
- Belvedere (structure)
- Dubai Smart Police Stations
- Fotomat
- Gazebo
- Pavilions
- Chahartaq (architecture)
- Self-service kiosk
- Telephone booth
- Vending machine
