= Jakov Brdar =

Slovene sculptor of Bosnian descent

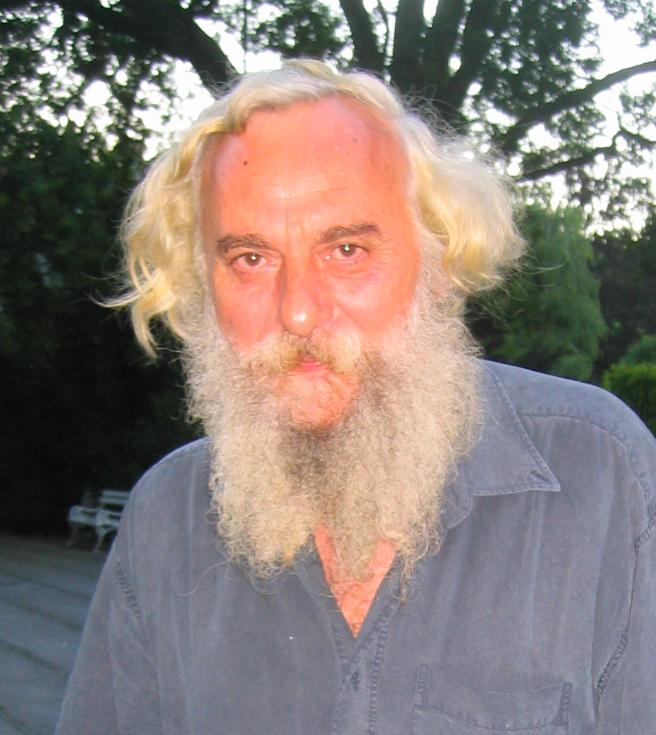
- Jakov Brdar in 2007
- Born: 22 April 1949 (age 77); Livno, People's Republic of Bosnia and Herzegovina, SFR Yugoslavia
- Occupation: Sculptor

Jakov Brdar (born 22 April 1949) is a Slovene sculptor of Bosnian descent. He is the author of many public statues and sculptures in Ljubljana. In 1998, he received the Prešeren Fund Award for the sculpture group Pridiga ptičem (Sermon to the Birds, 1997).

Brdar studied sculpturing on Academy of Fine Arts and Design in Ljubljana. He graduated in the class of professor Dušan Tršar in 1975, and completed specialised study in 1979. He has also lived and worked in Paris and Berlin.

Brdar's statues Adam and Eve, Satyr and Prometheus are on display at the Butchers' Bridge in Ljubljana city centre. His statue of the general Rudolf Maister is visible in the park next to the main bus station in Ljubljana. He also created a statue of "Saint Joseph in the Egipt". The statue stands in front of the St. Stanislaus Institute in Ljubljana-Šentvid. The gallery in Piran has his sculpture Pegasus (1990). In 1990 and 1991, he exhibited at the Pergamon Museum in Berlin.

== See also ==
- Mirsad Begić (born 1953), a Bosnian sculptor living in Ljubljana
- Slobodan Pejić (1944–2006), a Bosnian sculptor who lived in Ljubljana
