= Butchers' Bridge =

Footbridge in Ljubljana, Slovenia

Coordinates: 46°3′6.34″N 14°30′31.54″E

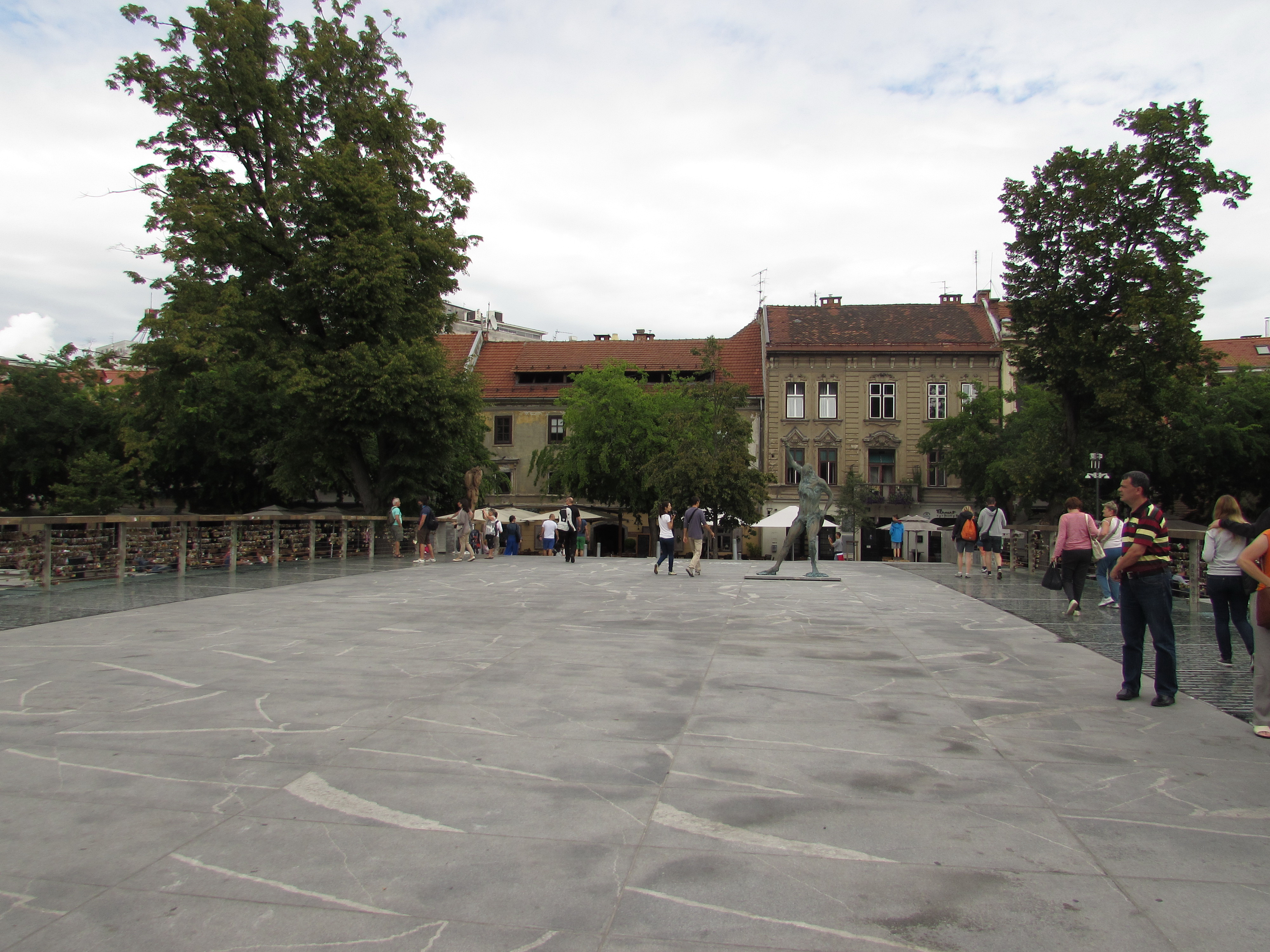
Butchers' Bridge (2014)

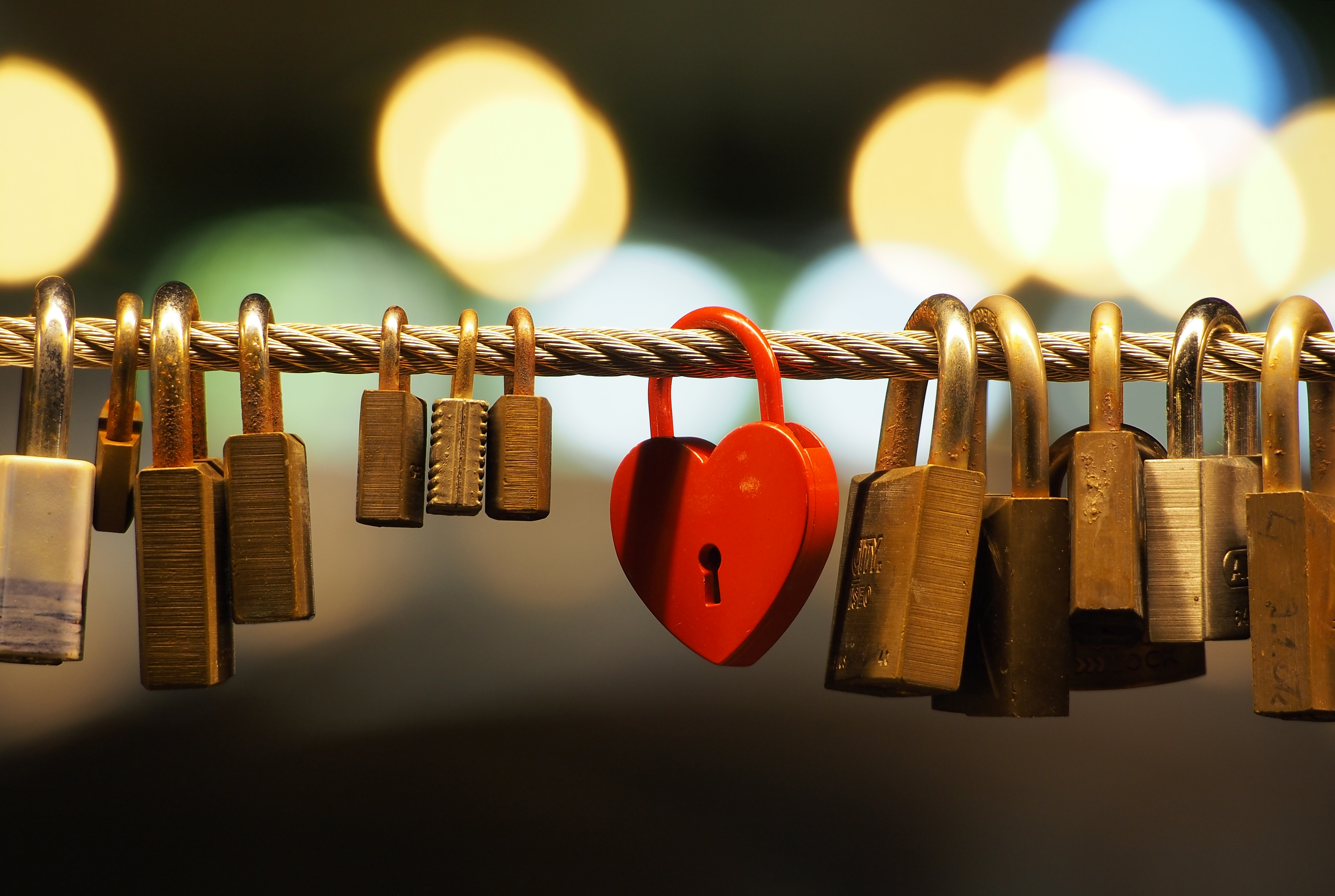
Love padlocks on the Butchers' Bridge

The Butchers' Bridge (Slovene: Mesarski most) is a footbridge crossing the river Ljubljanica in Ljubljana, the capital of Slovenia. It connects the Ljubljana Central Market and the Petkovšek Embankment (Petkovškovo nabrežje). The bridge was solemnly opened on 10 July 2010.

The original idea for a bridge on the site was expressed in the 1930s by the architect Jože Plečnik. The modern bridge, which is far more simple than the original plan, features a staircase at its left entry, a glass walking belts at the sides, and two fences with steel wires and wide top shelves. It was designed by Jurij Kobe from the Atelier Arhitekti studio. It is decorated with works by the sculptor Jakov Brdar.

== Sculptures ==
The largest sculptures on the bridge represent figures from Ancient Greek and Christian/Jewish mythology:

- Adam and Eve, shamed and banished from Paradise, after having been induced by the Serpent to taste from the Tree of Knowledge of Good and Evil (they are walking towards Ljubljana Cathedral)
- Satyr, startled by the Serpent
- Prometheus, running and disemboweled, in punishment for having given knowledge (of fire) to mankind

There are also some smaller grotesque sculptures of frogs and shellfish on the top of the bridge's fence.

== History ==
The construction of a bridge with the same name, Butchers' Bridge, was planned already in the late 1930s by the architect Jože Plečnik. According to his plans, the bridge was to be covered, and was a part of the Ljubljana Central Market. However, due to the outbreak of World War II, the bridge was never built. For more than fifty years, an empty spot in the middle of the Ljubljana Central Market marked the place where the bridge was meant to be built.

In the 1990s, the first proposals of building the bridge and thus completing Plečnik's project of the Ljubljana Market were advanced. Some proposed that the bridge should be built according to original plans, while others suggested that a modern bridge should be built.

In 2009, the city administration under the mayor Zoran Janković launched the construction of the current bridge, which cost 2.9 million euros and was completed the following year. The unveiling took place on 10 July 2010. Although a bridge was envisaged on the site already in the 1930s by the architect Jože Plečnik, who arranged his Water Axis along the Ljubljanica, Plečnik's bridge would be far more monumental and the current bridge is rather an antithesis than a completion of his plans. With its length of 33 metres (108 ft) and the width of 17.3 metres (57 ft), it functions as a square on water and is in this regard similar to Plečnik's bridges.

Shortly after the opening of the bridge padlocks of couples in love started appearing on its steel wires, symbolizing declarations of eternal love, a phenomenon similar to the one on the Parisian Pont des Arts.
