= Ljubljana Central Market =

Coordinates: 46°3′6″N 14°30′35″E

UNESCO World Heritage Site
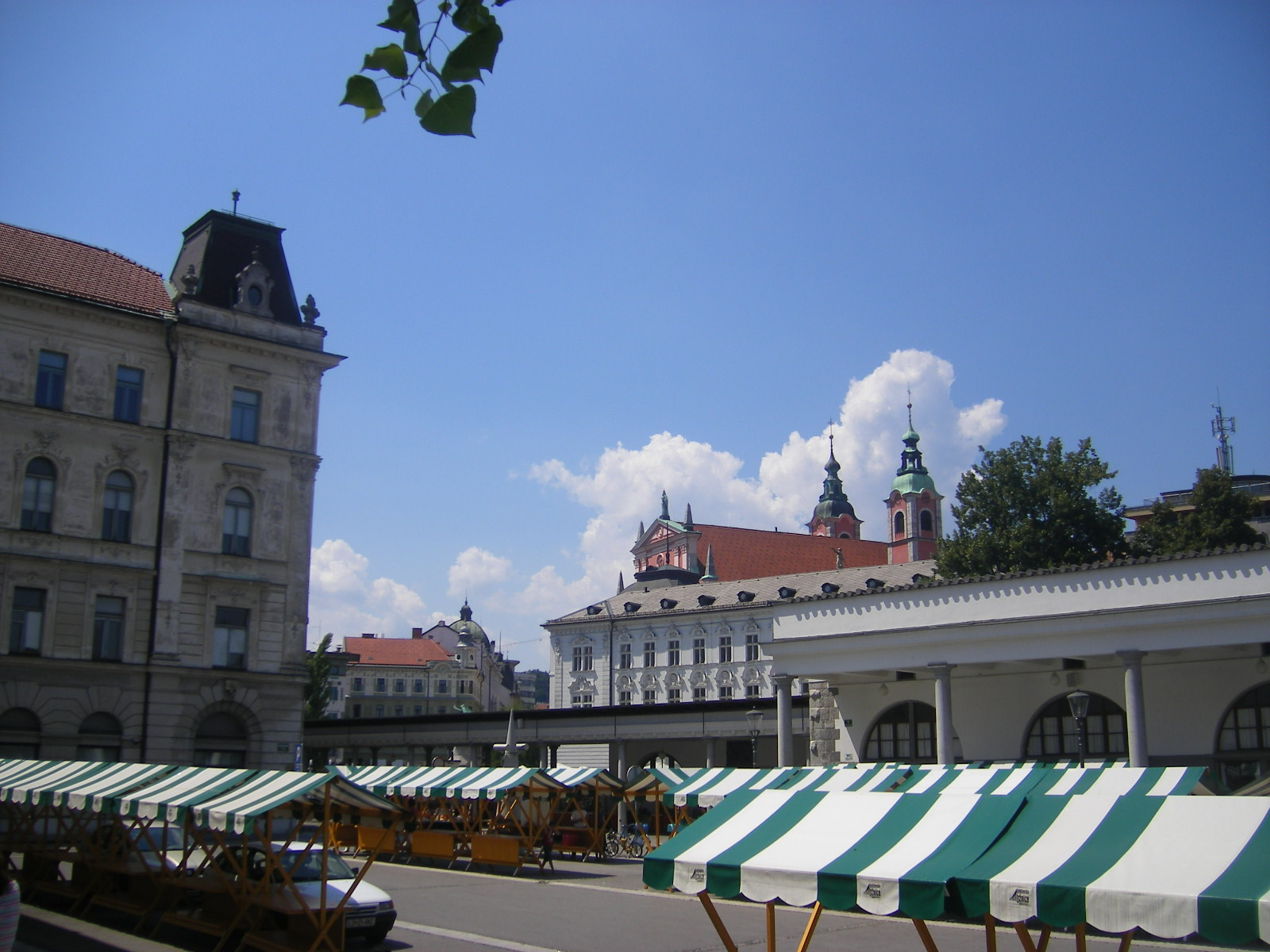
- Open market at Pogačar Square
- Interactive map of Ljubljana Central Market
- Location: Slovenia
- Part of: The works of Jože Plečnik in Ljubljana – Human Centred Urban Design
- Criteria: Cultural: (iv)
- Reference: 1643
- Inscription: 2021 (44th Session)

The Ljubljana Central Market (Slovene: Osrednja ljubljanska tržnica) is a market in Ljubljana, Slovenia. The riverside market building, sometimes referred to as Plečnik's Market (Slovene: Plečnikova tržnica), was designed by Jože Plečnik between 1931 and 1939. It stretches between the Triple Bridge and the Dragon Bridge, on the right bank of the Ljubljanica River. The marketplace and Vodnik Square (Slovene: Vodnikov trg), where it is located, are cultural monuments of national significance. It is partly located at Adamič and Lunder Embankment (Adamič-Lundrovo nabrežje) and at Pogačar Square (Pogačarjev trg).

== History ==
Plečnik's market building at the Ljubljana Central Market from the Dragon Bridge

The 1895 earthquake destroyed an old monastery with a diocesan college for girls. After the damaged building was removed, Vodnik Square provided a venue for an outdoor market. The present market building, designed by the architect Jože Plečnik, was built between 1940 and 1942 by Matko Curk's company. It originally had an area of 1,876 square metres (20,190 sq ft).

The design of the complex reflects Renaissance influences. It was conceived as a two-storey market hall following the curve of the river. On the side overlooking the river the market halls have large semi-circular windows, while the street side is defined by a colonnade. In order to provide views of the river, the building is interrupted with two open-columned loggias. The roof is covered with concrete tiles.

Plečnik planned to fill the middle gap between the market halls with a monumental covered bridge to connect to the Petkovšek Embankment (Petkovškovo nabrežje), but his design was never built. His plans for a bridge were finally fulfilled in July 2010, when the newly designed Butchers' Bridge was inaugurated.

Since August 2021, the Ljubljana Central Market has been inscribed as part of Plečnik's legacy on the UNESCO World Heritage List.

== Market ==
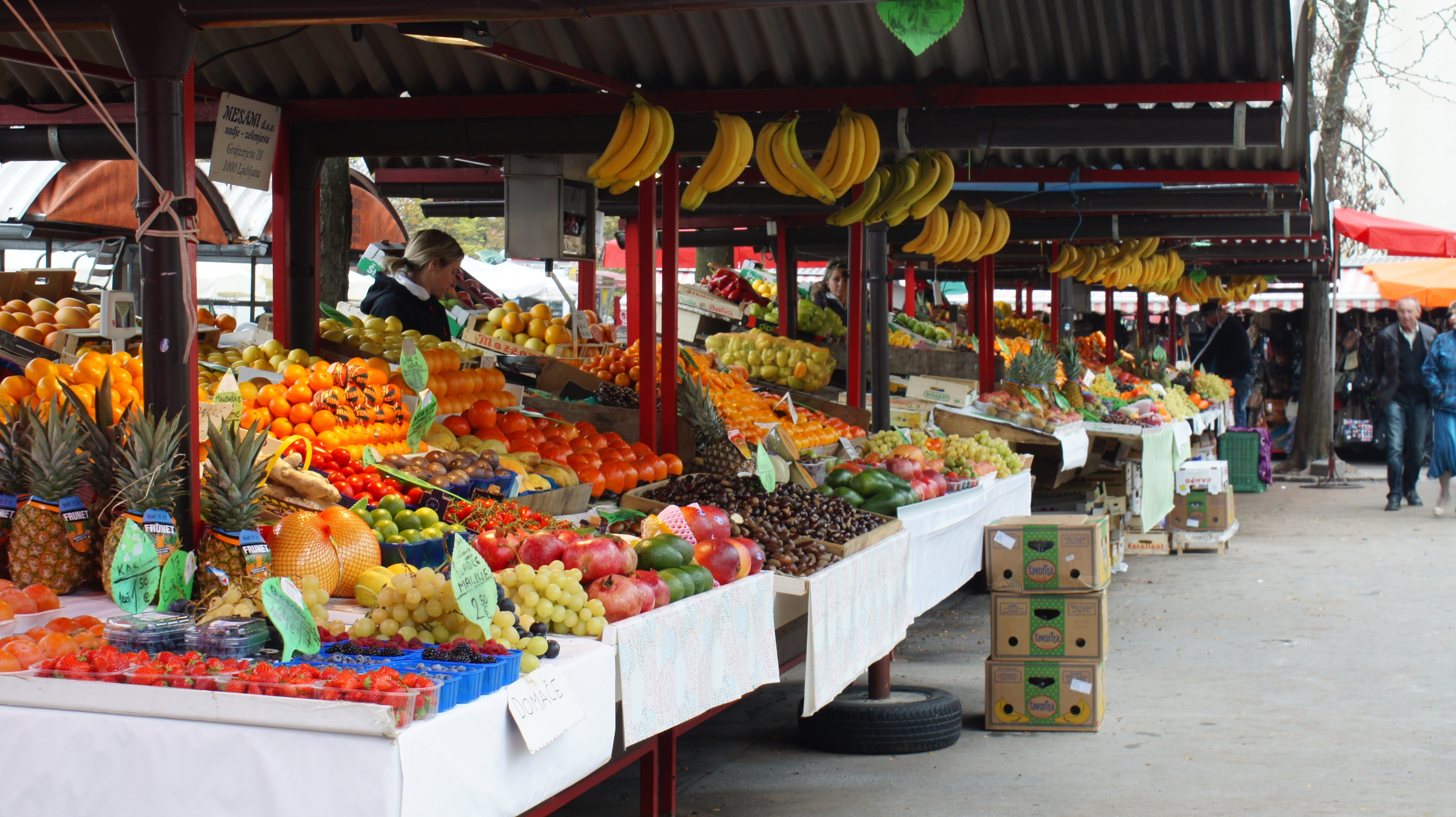
Fruit stalls at the market

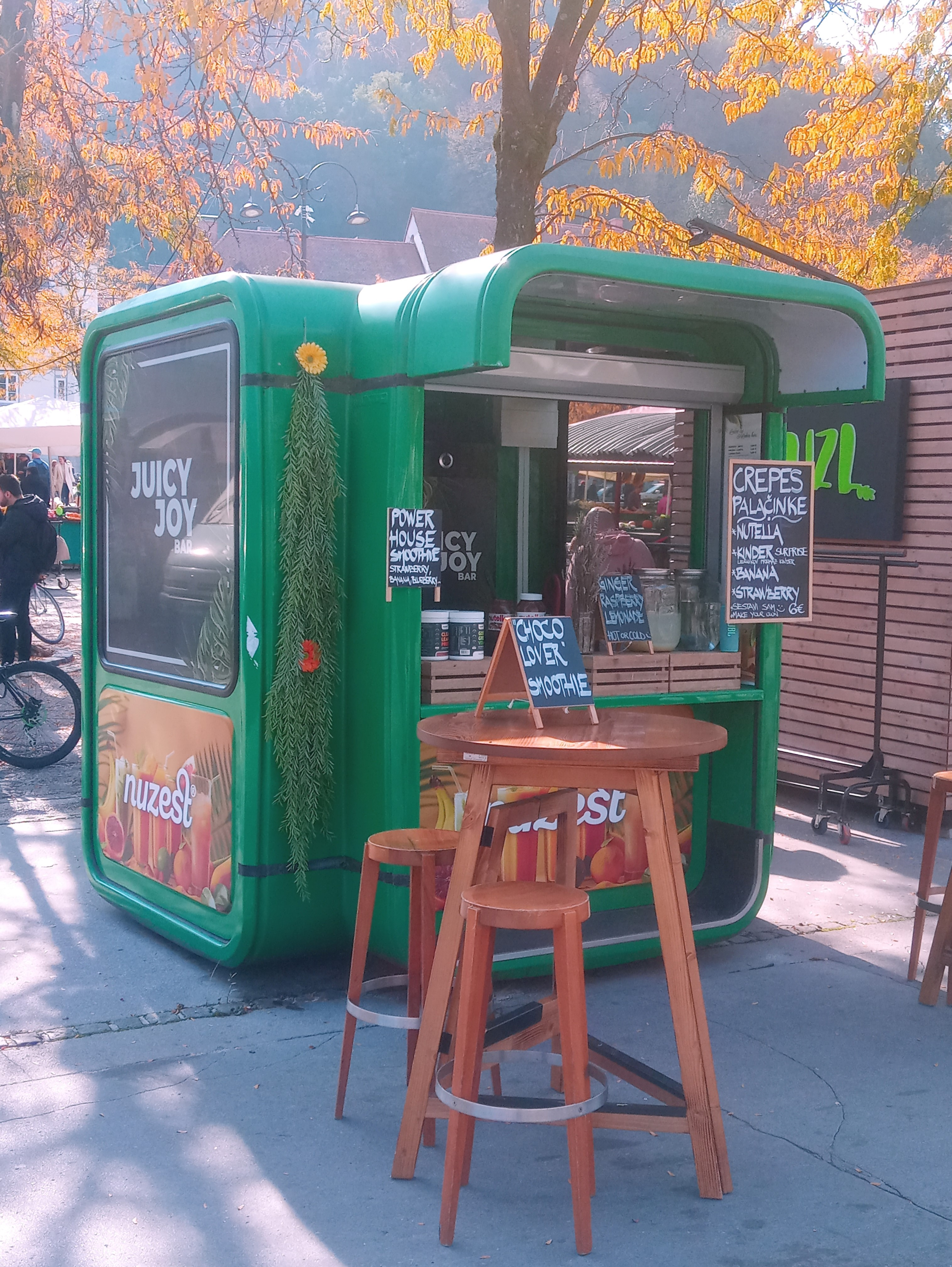
K67 kiosk located at Ljubljana Central Market

The market is open daily except for Sundays. It has a flower market at the junction of Pogačar Square and Vodnik Square, a fish market and dried fruit on the lower level of the market hall and bakery, dairy and meat stalls on both levels. The colonnade at the Triple Bridge end provides shelter for stalls selling herbs, spices, and arts and crafts.

== Legal status ==
From October 2008, the market was provisionally protected by the Slovenian Ministry of Culture under Vasko Simoniti as a cultural monument of national importance. The decree was annulled by his successor Majda Širca in February 2009. In March 2012, the protection at the state level was reenacted by Žiga Turk for one year with the protection of the Vodnik Square Archaeological Site. It has been disputed by the City Municipality of Ljubljana, aiming to build a parking garage under it, since June 2012 at the Slovenian Constitutional Court. The protection has been endorsed by the civil initiative We're Not Giving Up the Market (Tržnice ne damo).
