= K67 kiosk =

Modular kiosk for retail, etc.

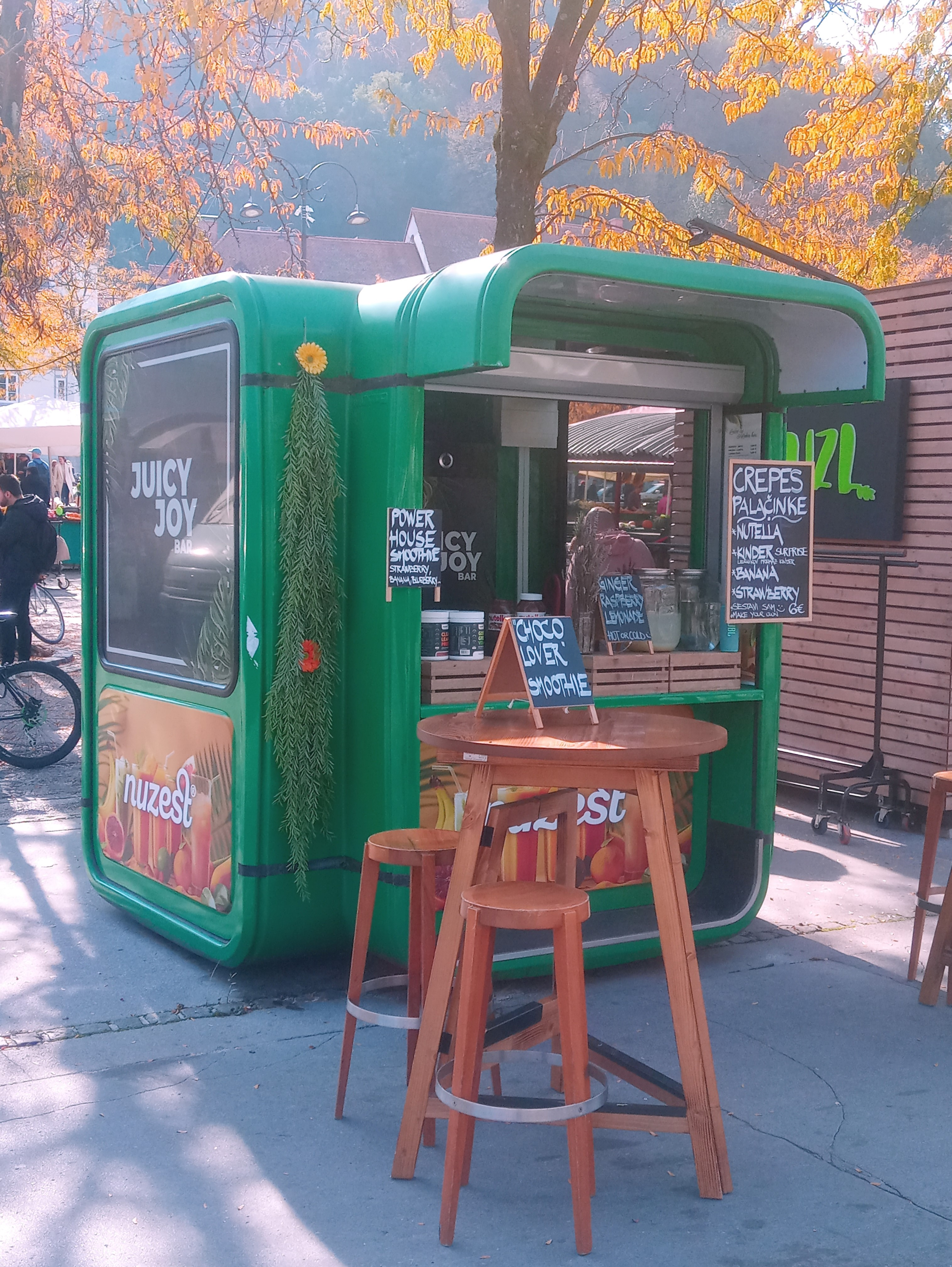
Typical K67 kiosk located at Ljubljana Central Market

K67 is a modular kiosk design created in 1966 by the Yugoslavian and Slovenian architect and designer Saša J. Mächtig.

== Design ==
The design is based on polyfibre reinforced modules, which can be used as single units or combined to large agglomerations. It can serve many different functions; throughout its history it has been used for newspaper kiosks, parking-attendant booths, copyshops, market stands, shelter booths, chip stalls, student cafes, and lottery stands. It appears in different colour combinations (red is the most common), and it is easily visible and accessible. The modular design of the units enables the K67 to fit almost any location.

The original K67 system had 5 different modular pieces including the cross-shaped unit, corridor link piece, and triangular unit. The base construction would be furnished with secondary and tertiary components like façades, canopies and interior furnishings, and later on with vending machines. A second generation design introduced in 1972 was designed to be disassemblable with separate ceilings, corners, and floor shells unlike the original monolithic construction.

== History ==
Patented in 1967, K67 was prepared for serial production in 1968 with the first exhibition of prototypes in Ljutomer, Slovenia. It was manufactured by the Imgrad factory in Ljutomer.

The K67 found success with small vendors in Poland during the country's transition to capitalism in the 1990s. A locally produced kiosk model called the Kami was derived from the K67.

Production continued until 1999, by when around 7,500 units had been produced.

The K67 was first exhibited at the Museum of Modern Art in 1971. In 2018, MoMA featured the K67 in the exhibit Toward a Concrete Utopia: Architecture in Yugoslavia.

== Gallery ==
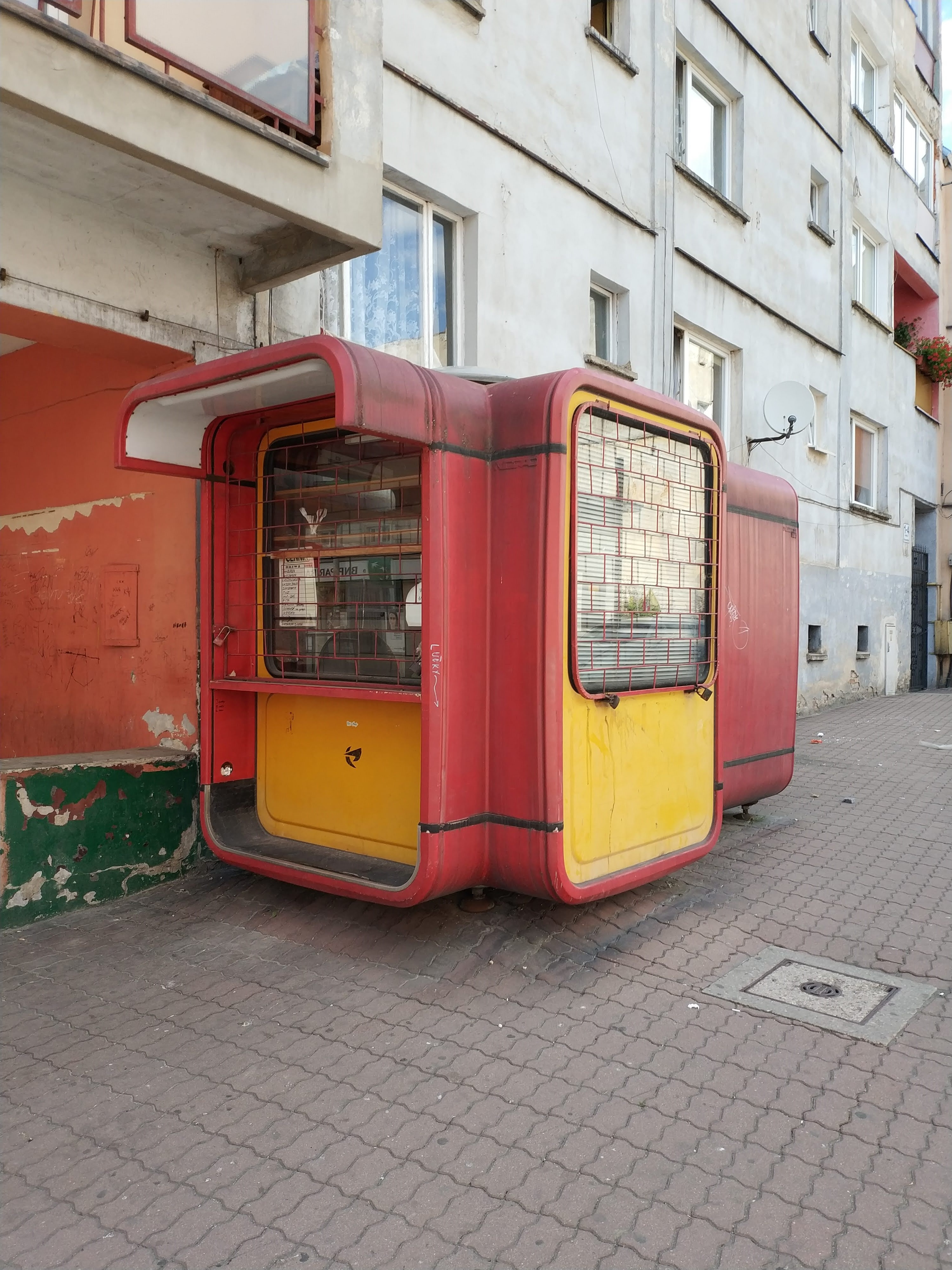

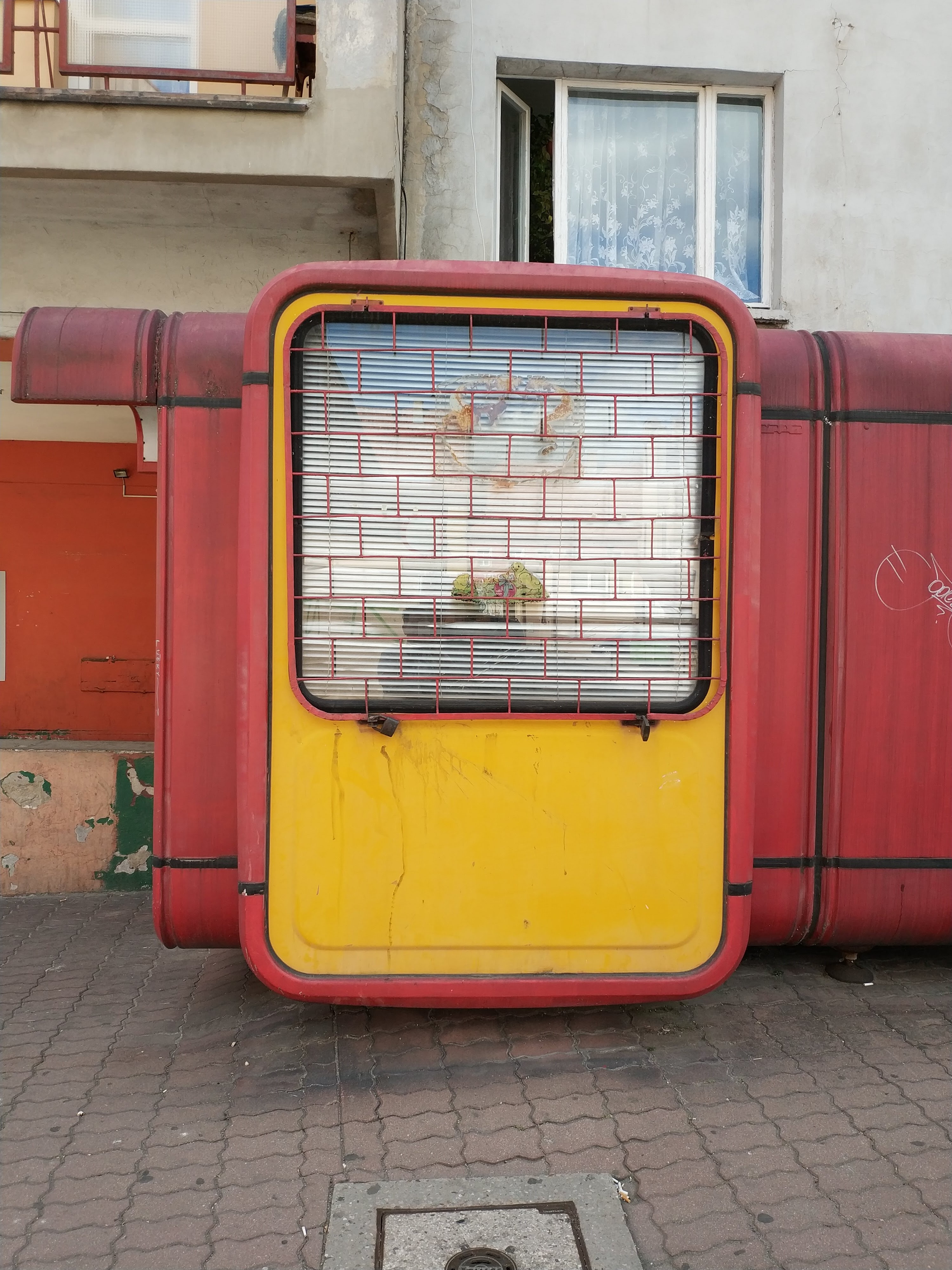
Kiosk from the side

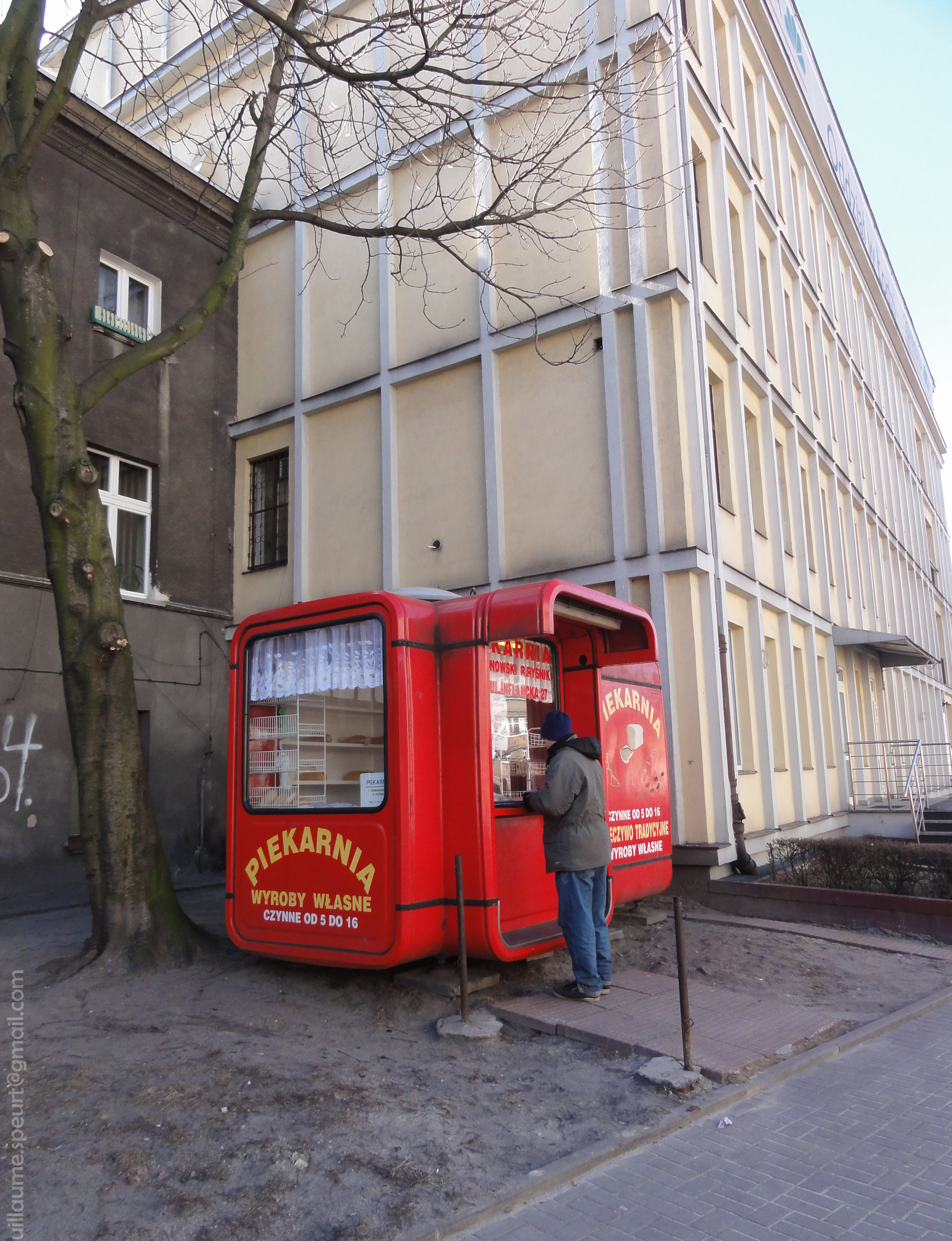
One-cell K67 kiosk as bakery in Lodz, Poland

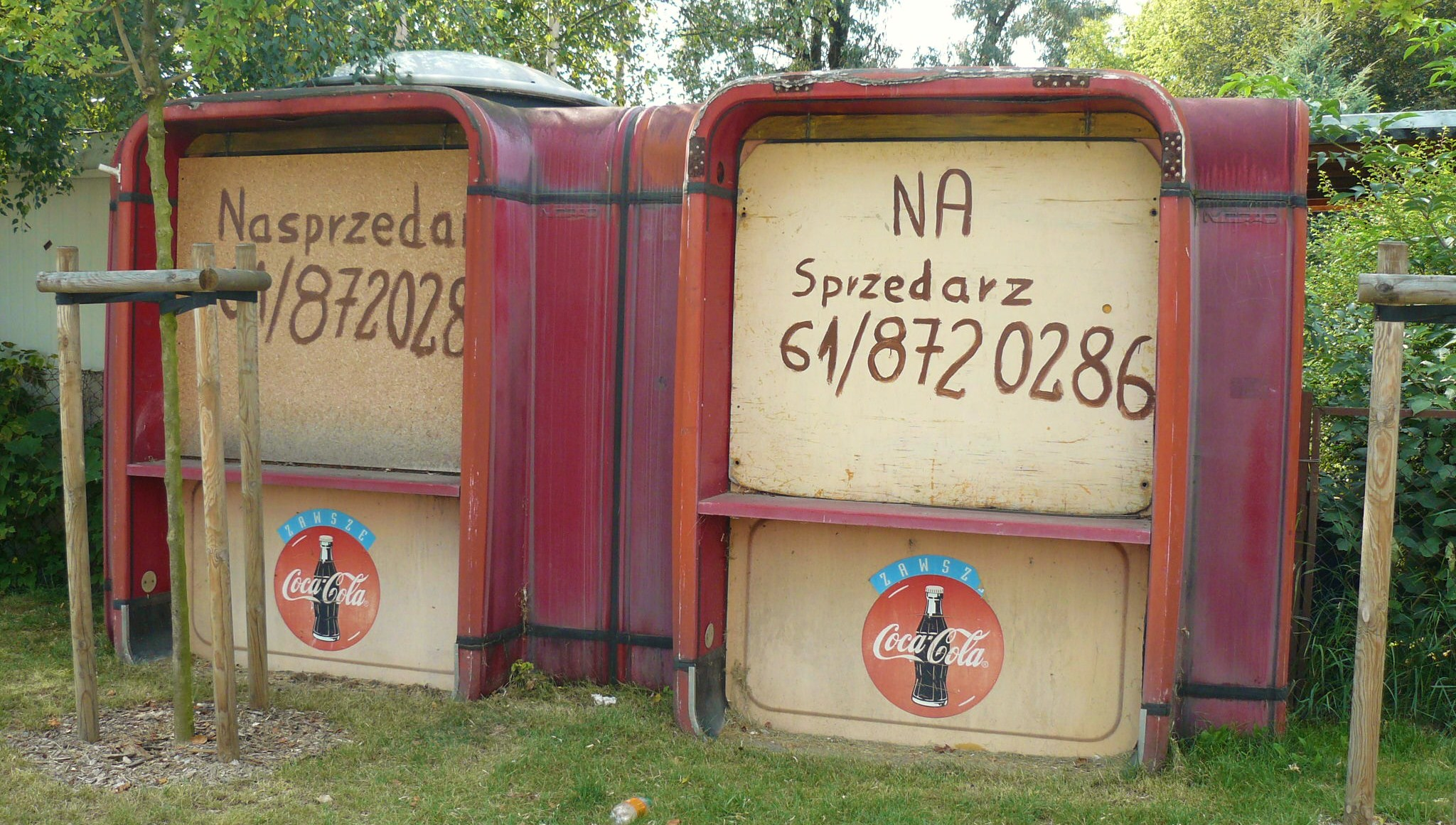
A two-cell kiosk in Poznań, Poland

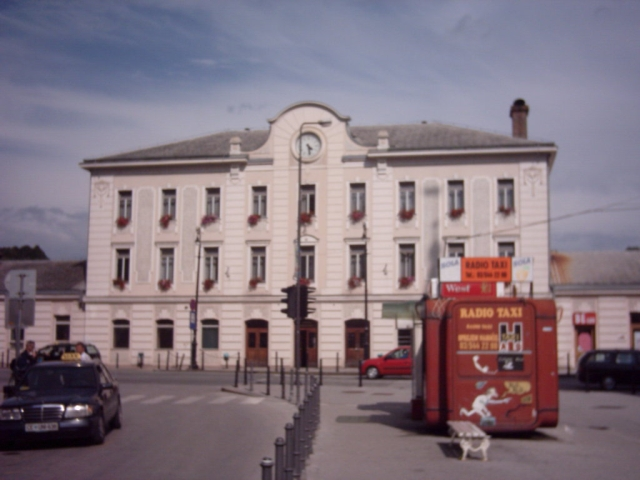
Taxi service K67 kiosk in front of Celje railway station, Slovenia

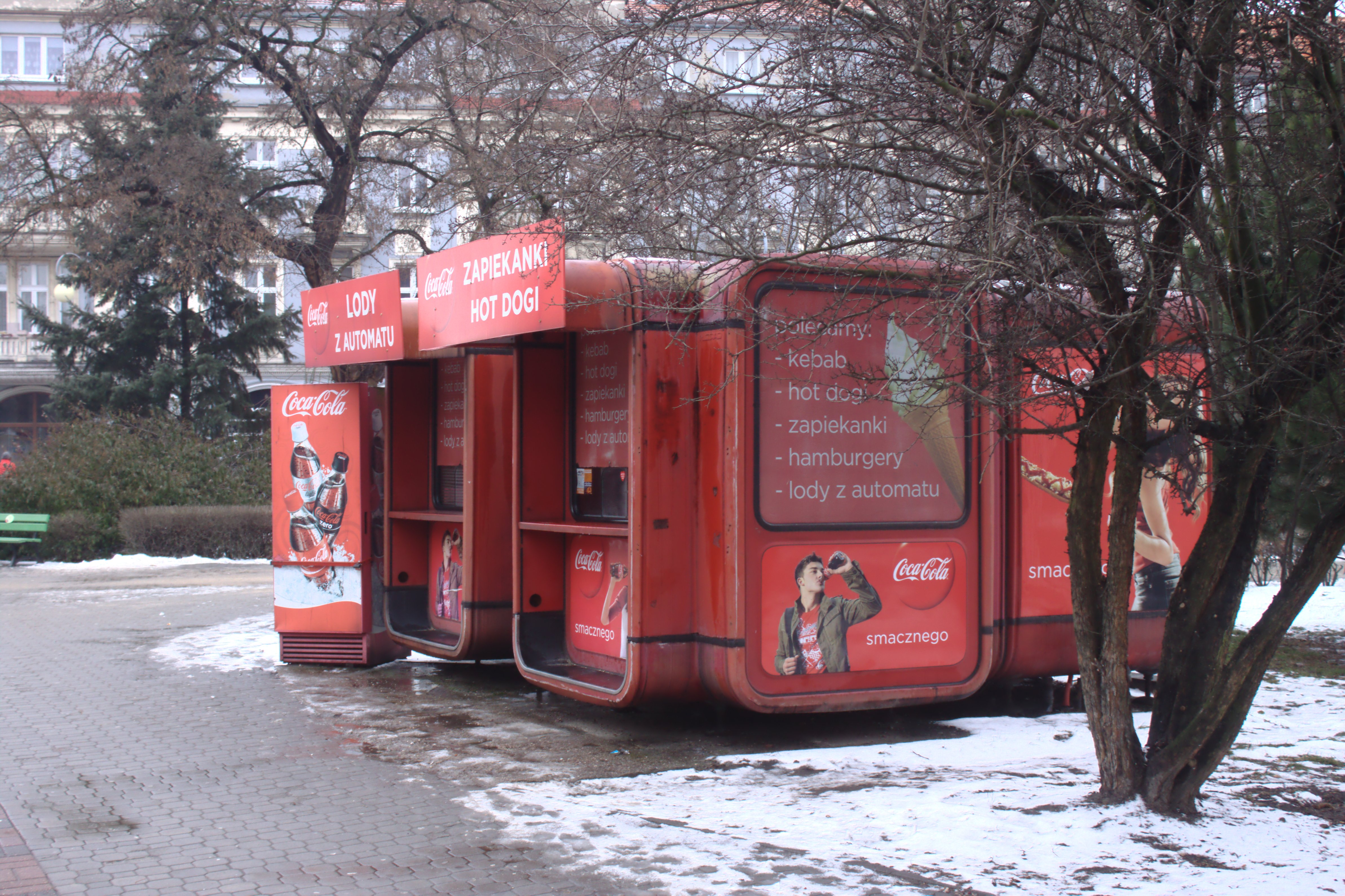
A two-cell K67 fast food kiosk in Kalisz, Poland

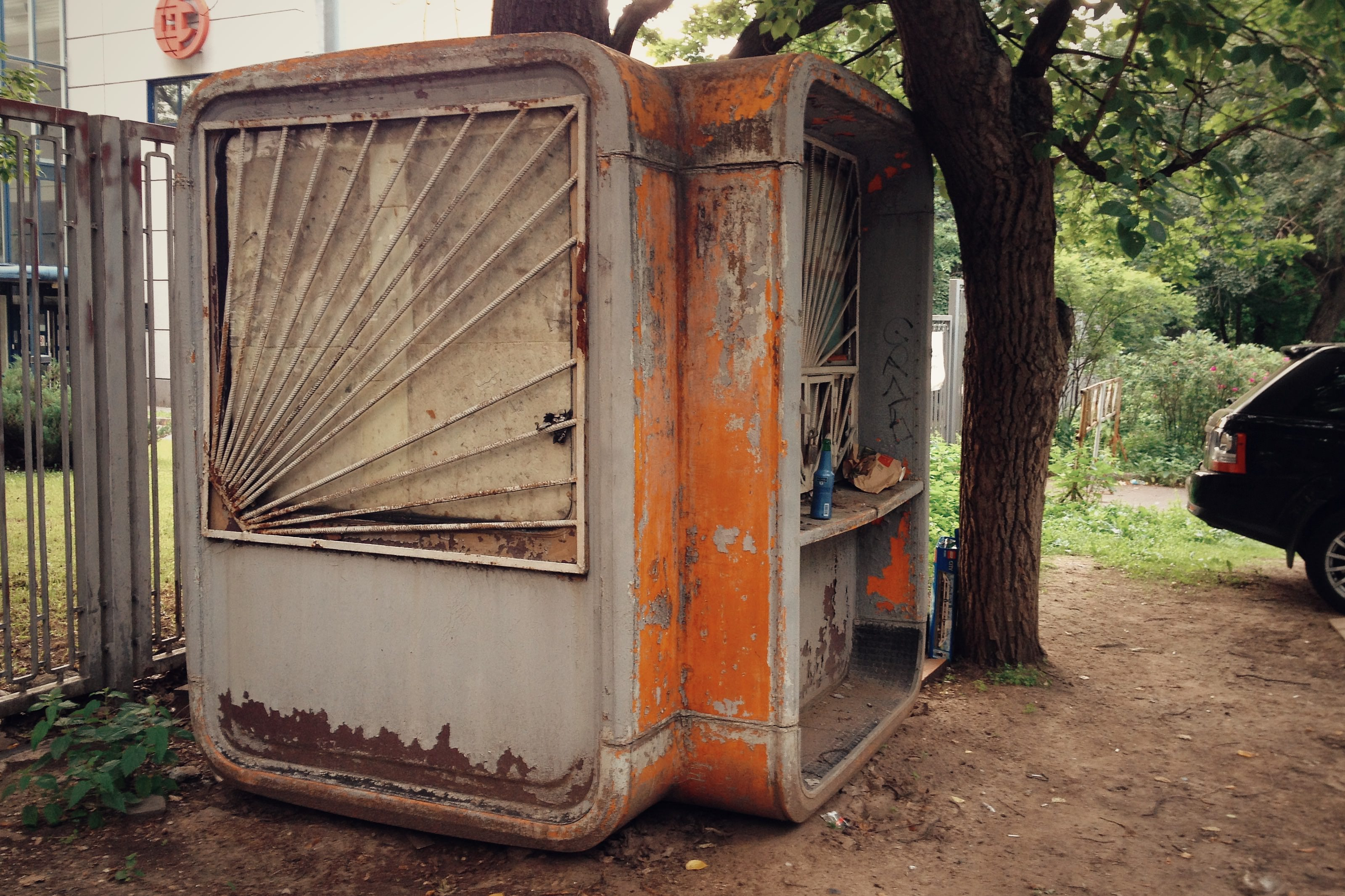
dilapidated K67 kiosk in Moscow, Russia
