= Avgust Berthold =

Slovenian impressionist photographer (1880–1919)

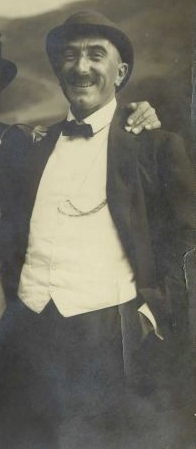
- Born: 20 July 1880; Puštal, Austria-Hungary
- Died: 1 August 1919 (aged 39); Ljubljana, Kingdom of Yugoslavia
- Occupation: Photographer
- Known for: Photography, Impressionism

Avgust Berthold (20 July 1880 – 1 August 1919) was a Slovenian photographer who is associated with the Impressionist movement.

== Childhood ==
Berthold was born in Puštal (Wolkensperg) castle in Upper Carniola, Austria-Hungary. His mother, Ema Wolkensperg, was the sister of a Puštal baron who owned Wolkensperg castle. Soon after Berthold was born, his mother died and he was subsequently placed in the care of his father. As Berthold's father was preoccupied with employed work, Berthold was raised by his grandmother. Berthold was seven years of age when his father died of disease and his education was consequently overseen by relatives in Puštal.

== Photography and art ==
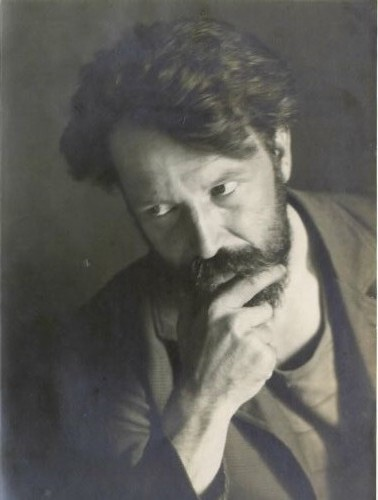
Photo of Rihard Jakopič by Avgust Berthold

Berthold first encountered photography with Rihard Jakopič, who was also living in Puštal. Jakopič informed Berthold of the education opportunities in Munich and Vienna, cities that, at the time, attracted the majority of Slovenian artists seeking artistic, spiritual and professional development. Berthold subsequently attended numerous lectures and shows in Munich, where he also participated in Anton Ažbes painting class. In Vienna, Berthold was introduced to new photographic possibilities and proceeded to improve upon the education that he received.

== Financial windfall ==
Berthold, together with his relative, Alexander Berthold (an admiral in Pula and Trieste), purchased a lottery ticket and won the main prize. The lottery winnings allowed Berthold to buy a house in Ljubljana and set up an atelier (French term for "workshop").

== Death ==
Berthold died in Ljubljana, then a part of the Kingdom of Yugoslavia.

== Photographic atelier ==
In the spring of 1905 Berthold received the operation permit for his atelier. In Slovenski Narod newspaper he published the advert, where it said that "He announces the opening of the most modern photographic atelier in Ljubljana and invites people to attend his services of portrait, outdoor, interior, sport, group, reproduction photography. Atelier was opened also on Sundays and holidays."

Berthold's works were exhibited at very influential shows, from which he received many prizes. Most important was a bronze medal which he received at the international show of art on the 75th independence of Belgium. Another important prize was from a show in Oslo, Norway. Data about the both prizes were printed at the back of each photograph. On the front side were ornaments and his signature.

Berthold also acquired an X-ray device, which helped him and his family earn money during the war years. The line in front of an X-ray hospital was very long with the injuries sustained at the Battle of the Isonzo, but handling the X-ray device was very dangerous and it was exclusively Berthold's task. After 1919 he became sick due to collected radioactivity and died at the age of 39. The X-ray device was handed to Dr. Pogačnik and was last used at a vet clinic. It is now residing at the technical museum in Bistra.

== Berthold's works ==
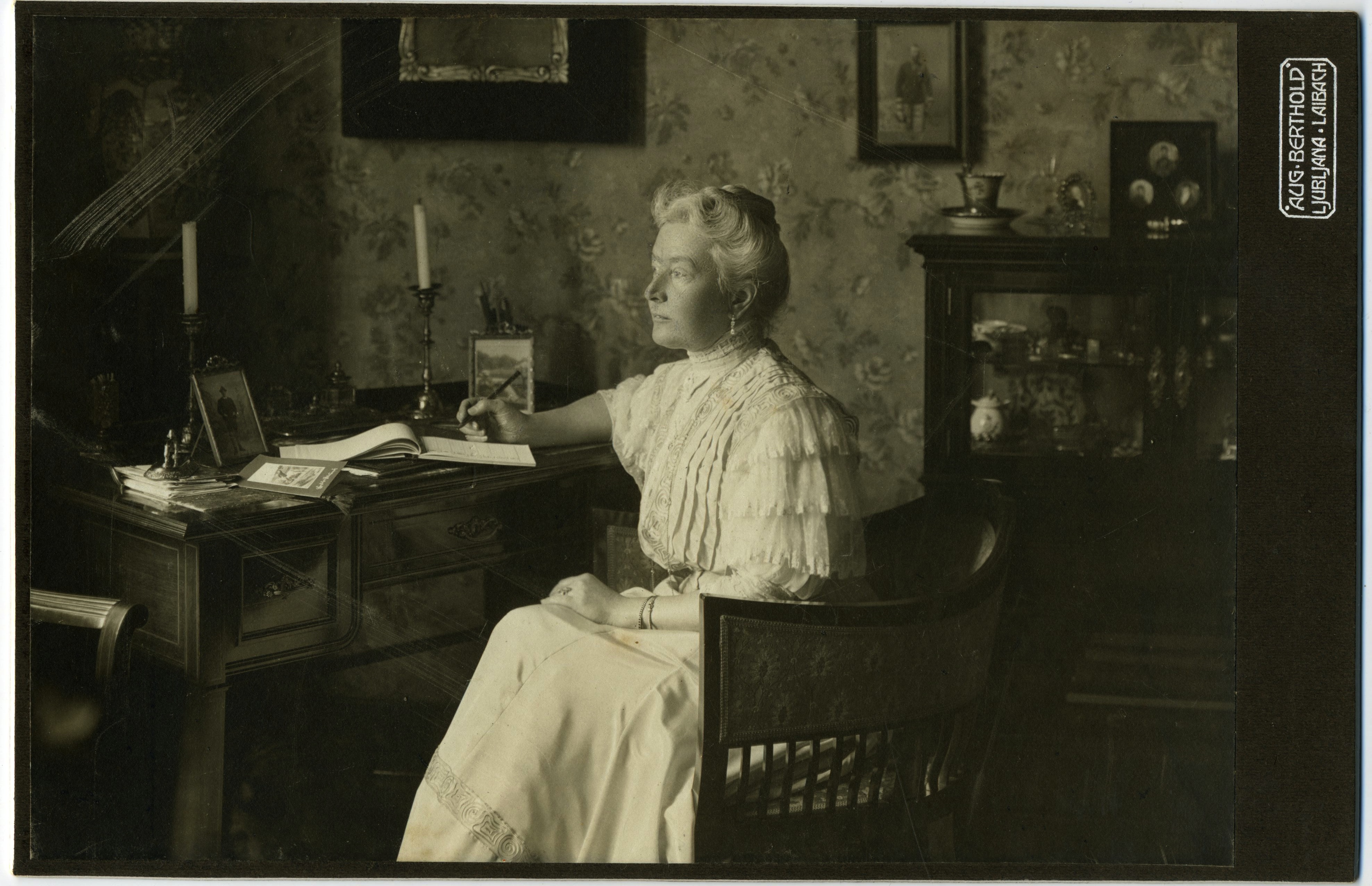
Female portrait by Avgust Berthold

Beside Berthold's photographs of the famous people from that period (Ivan Cankar, Alojz Gradnik, Rihard Jakopič, Fran Levec, Pavel Golia) Berthold also did art photography and was the first Slovenian art photographer. Today we consider him among the impressionistic photographers. His nickname is the fifth Slovenian impressionist.

Berthold's photographic heritage could be divided between:

- landscape photography (intimate landscape – intimate passage, seasides, mountains)
- genre photography (farming life, children life – games)
- portrait photography (family portraits, personal – creative portraits, public – documentary portraits)
- documentary photography

Berthold's best works are landscape and genre photography, he got the most rewards on exhibitions for these, and some have also represented his pictorialistic – painting way in his photography, which at the time was the most modern.

Motives for landscape photography Berthold sought in trees, woods, swamps, rivers, paths, nature in various year cycles and day cycles, mostly at dusk or dawn, when the exchange of the light is the most visible. He was avoiding mid-day time, when the sun shines vertically. His nicest motive were birches, between the years 1905 until 1907 he made a cycle of landscape photographies with birches, which were made in gum bichromate procedure, this was his favourite procedure which allowed him the most experimenting and acquired him an award in Oslo in 1908.

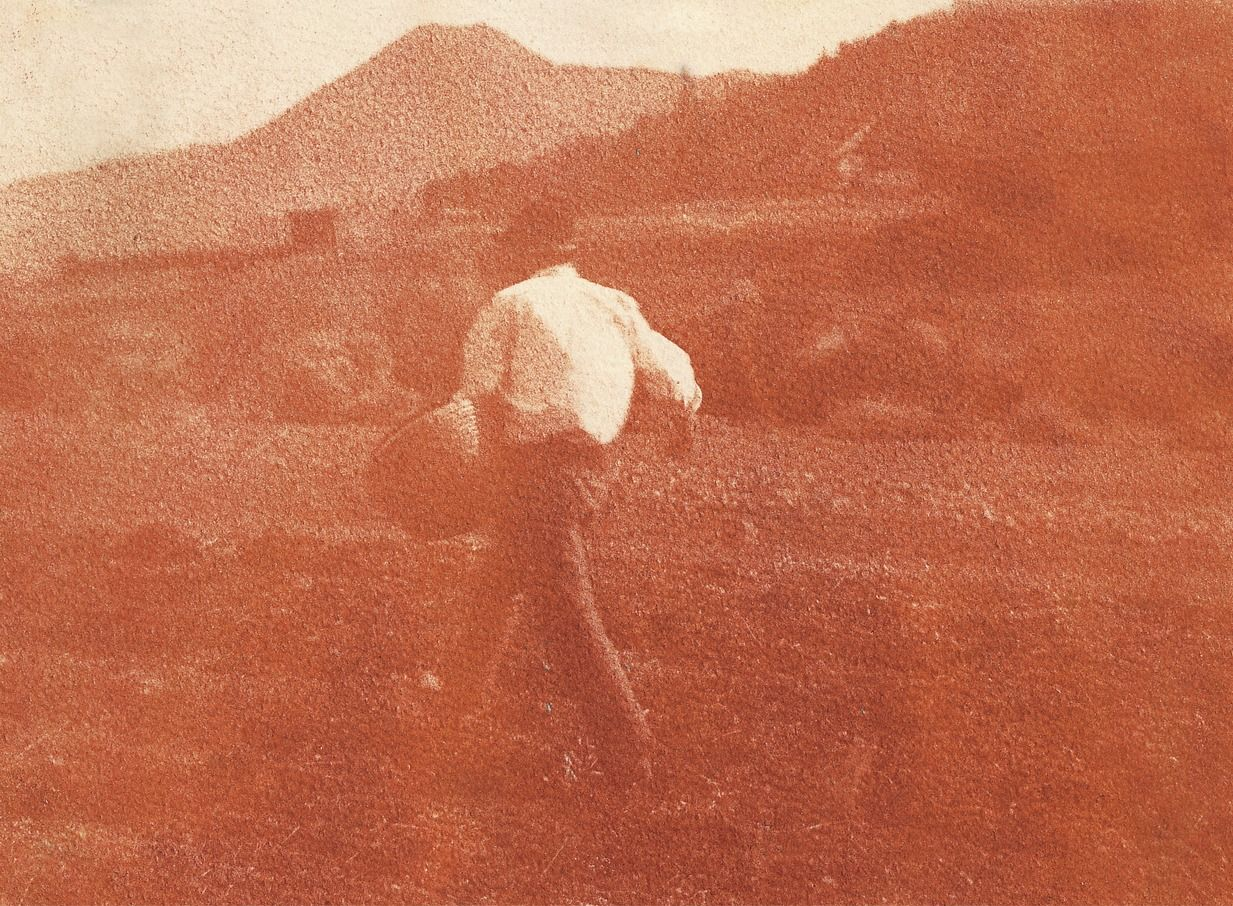
The Sower by Avgust Berthold

Berthold liked to photograph farmers when they were working. Farmer who was bent down to reach the earth in his specific gestures, showed the type of a person connected with the past and time, when people were still more connected with the nature, when they were fully dependent on it. Berthold had numerous occasions to watch the farmers at their day work in the surrounding area of Škofja Loka, where he walked around the paths, hills and villages. His most famous work is the photography of The sewer, which was made in 1906 at the area around Škofja Loka, somewhere between the villages Pungert and Gosteče. Photography probably wasn't made randomly between hiking, most probably it is a selectively defined composition. The figure, position and moves of the farmer are organised and the whole composition is lighting balanced. A year after the photography was made, the painting of Ivan Grohar – The sower was made, which differs from the original only by the hayrack, which instead of the hill is painted a bit blurred in the background. Most probably Ivan Grohar was looking at Berthold's photograph, which was the usual practice of Slovenian impressionist painters at that time. The motive is also engraved on the 5-cent Euro coin in current times, which was designed by Miljenko Licul.

A prominent medium in Berthold's work is his portrait photography. The majority of his photographic portraits were of his family members for his own fun and pleasure, particularly himself with his wife Helena and daughter Ema. Additionally noteworthy are his portraits of his colleagues Ivan Tavčar, Ivan Cankar, Oton Župančič, Anton Aškerc, Ivan Grohar and Rihard Jakopič.
