= Louise Jama-van Raders =

Dutch portrait painter (1871–1946)

- Louisa Elisabeth Hermine Jama-van Raders
- Born: 2 March 1871; Batavia
- Died: April 24, 1946 (aged 75); The Hague
- Known for: portrait painter
- Spouse: Matija Jama
- Children: Agnes Jama

Louisa Elisabeth Hermine Jama-van Raders (Batavia, 2 March 1871 – The Hague, 24 April 1946) was a Dutch portrait painter.

== Life and work ==
Louise van Raders was born in the Dutch East Indies, the daughter of Willem Herman Frederik Hendrik van Raders (1827–1889), director of Public Works in Batavia, and Jeanne Madelaine Prins (1842–1918). In September 1879, the Van Raders family moved to Zutphen. After her father was appointed director of the Dutch-Indian Railway Company (1882) and the Java Railway Company (1883), the family moved to The Hague in 1885.

Van Raders was educated at the Royal Academy of Art, The Hague (c. 1896 – 1900) as a pupil of Frits Jansen and took anatomy classes with Louis Bolk in Amsterdam. She then studied in Munich, where she met the painter Matija Jama (1872–1947). He would become one of the important early-20th-century Slovenian impressionists alongside Rihard Jakopič and Ivan Grohar. Van Raders and Jama married in 1902. Three children were born from this marriage, including composer Agnes Jama (1911–1993). The couple participated in several Slovenian art exhibitions. The Jama family lived in Croatia, Germany and Austria, among other places, until they moved to The Hague in 1915 because of World War I. That year, Jama-van Raders exhibited paintings and drawings with Constance de Nerée tot Babberich and Willemien Testas at Pictura gallery in The Hague and de Vries gallery in Arnhem. Due to a lack of income, the couple opened a boarding house in The Hague in 1920. However, Matija Jama returned to Ljubljana two years later, where he would stay - with some interruptions - until his death.

Jama-van Raders participated in exhibitions at The Hague art rooms Zeestraat 65A (1923) and Erica (1926). She had two solo exhibitions at the Royal Gallery Kleykamp; in 1930, she exhibited 24 portraits (mostly of wealthy women) in oil and pastel. In 1937, she also exhibited a number of group portraits. Jama-van Raders made portraits of, among others, Willem Naudin ten Cate, Minister of the Navy, and Mien van Wulfften Palthe-Broese van Groenou.

Louise Jama-van Raders died at the age of 75. The death certificate (1946, B982) lists her as the widow of Mathias Jama and a daughter of Willy van Raders and Madelon Prins.

== Gallery ==
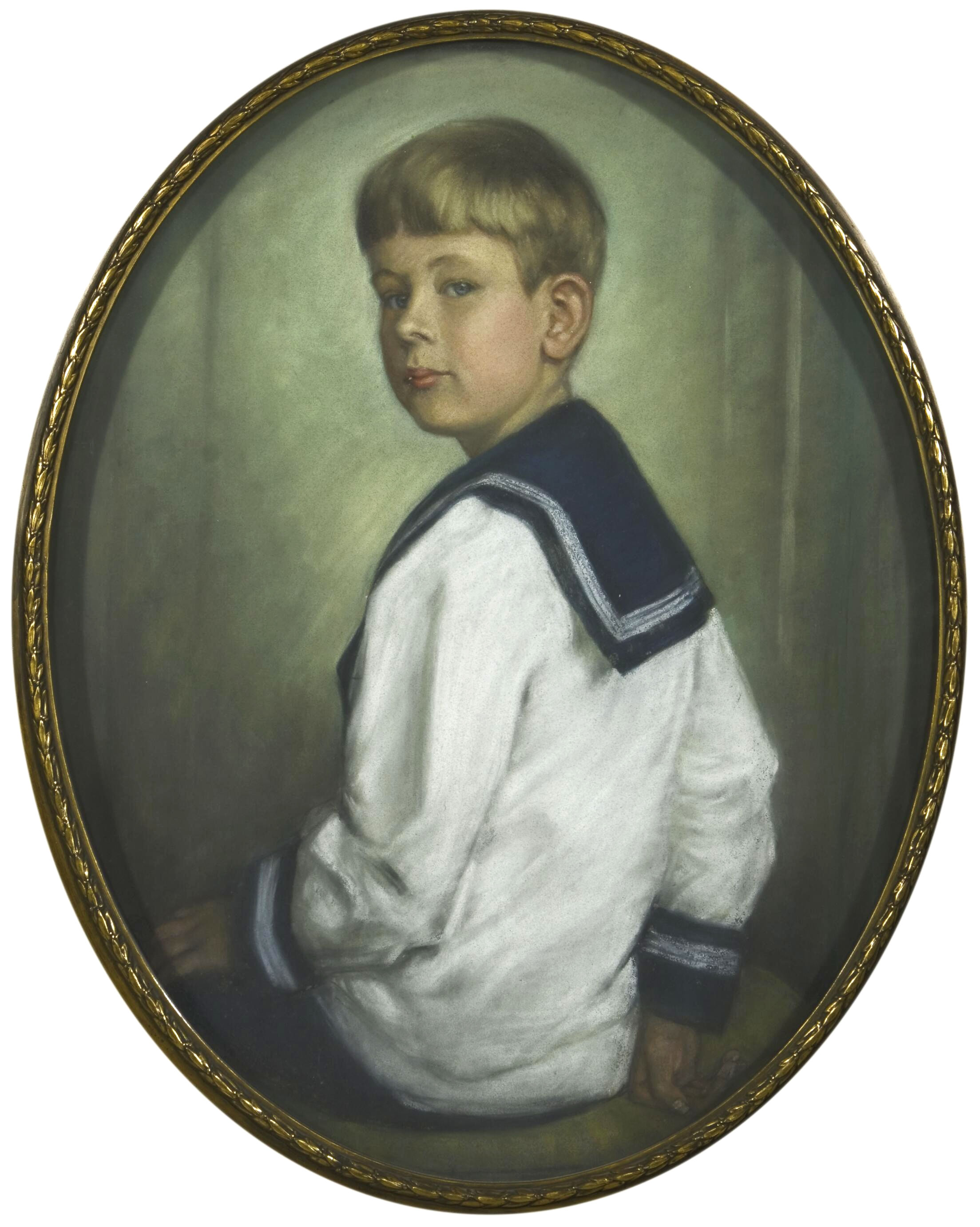
ca. 1920 - Portrait of C.H. de Loches Rambonnet

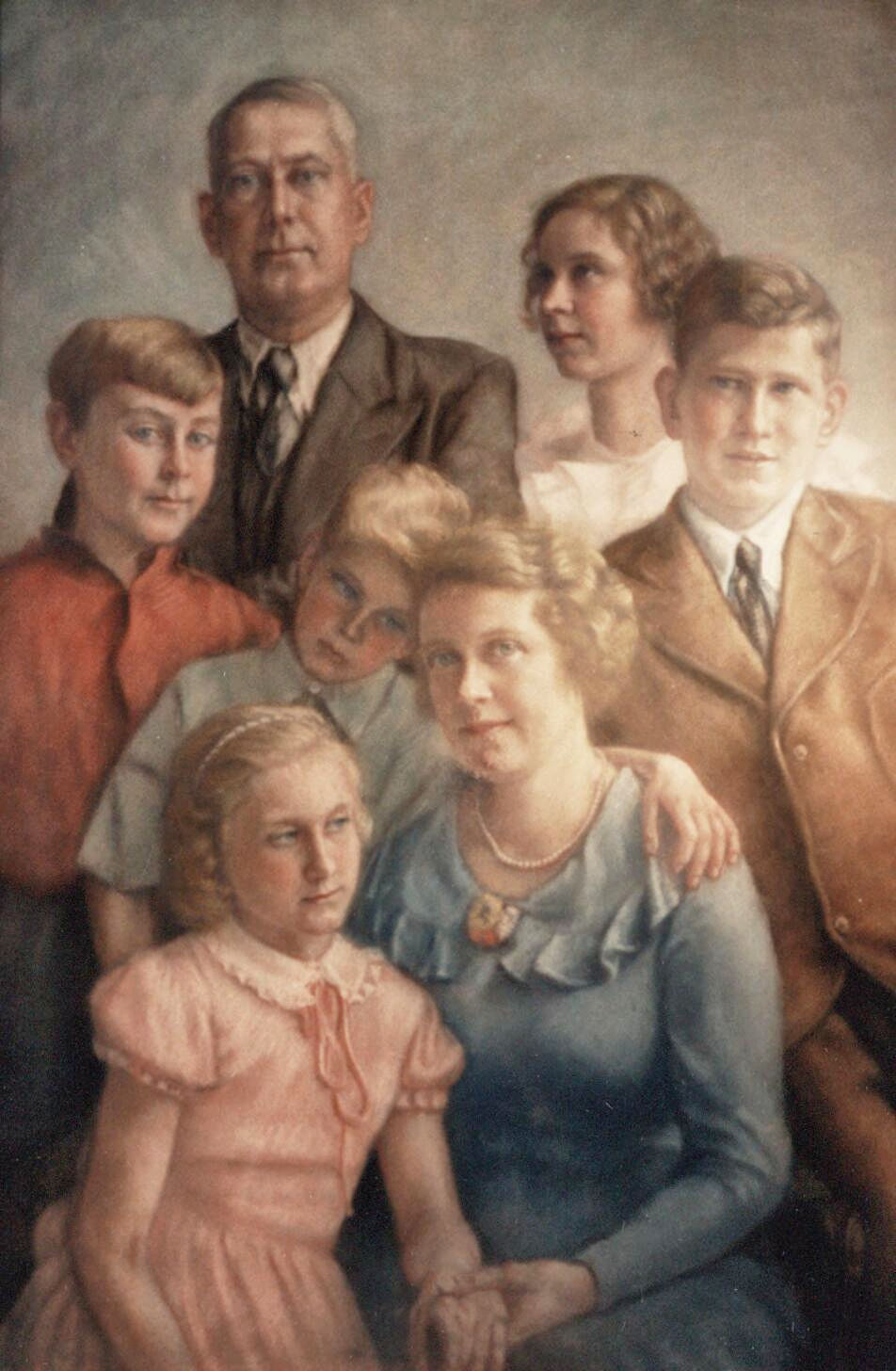
1936 - Portrait of the De Jongh-Hees family
