= Sveta Helena, Dol pri Ljubljani =

Sveta Helena
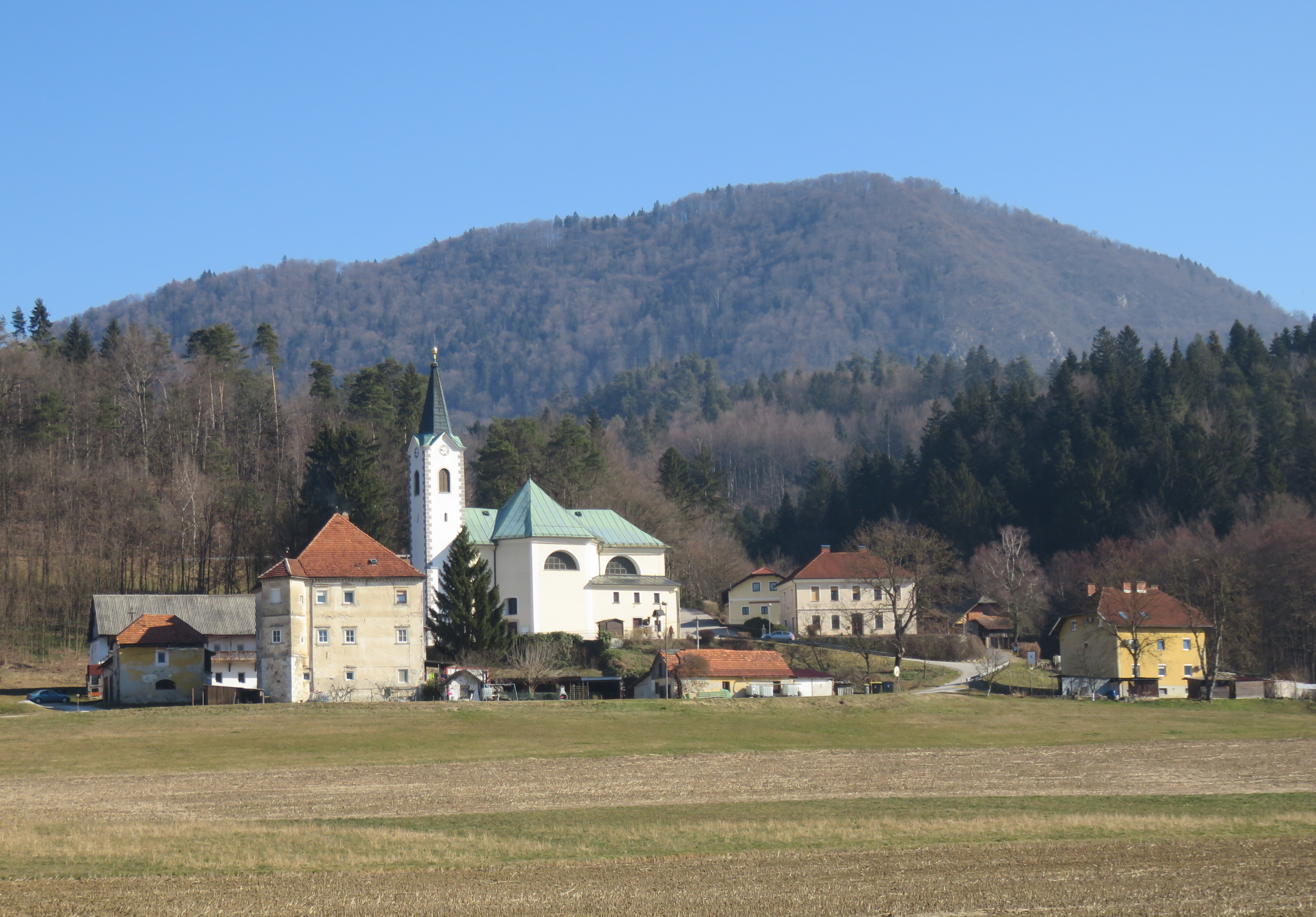

- Location in Slovenia
- Coordinates: 46°5′53″N 14°40′55″E
- Country: Slovenia
- Traditional region: Upper Carniola
- Statistical region: Central Slovenia
- Municipality: Dol pri Ljubljani
- Elevation: 280 m (920 ft)

Sveta Helena (pronounced [ˈsʋeːta xɛˈleːna], German: Sankt Helena) is a former settlement in the Municipality of Dol pri Ljubljani in central Slovenia. It is now part of the village of Kamnica. The area is part of the traditional region of Upper Carniola. The municipality is now included in the Central Slovenia Statistical Region.

== Geography ==
Sveta Helena lies in the southeastern part of the village of Kamnica, north of the main road from Ljubljana to Litija.

== History ==
Sveta Helena had a population of 144 living in 27 houses in 1900. Sveta Helena was annexed by Kamnica in 1953, ending its existence as an independent settlement.

== Žerjav Castle ==
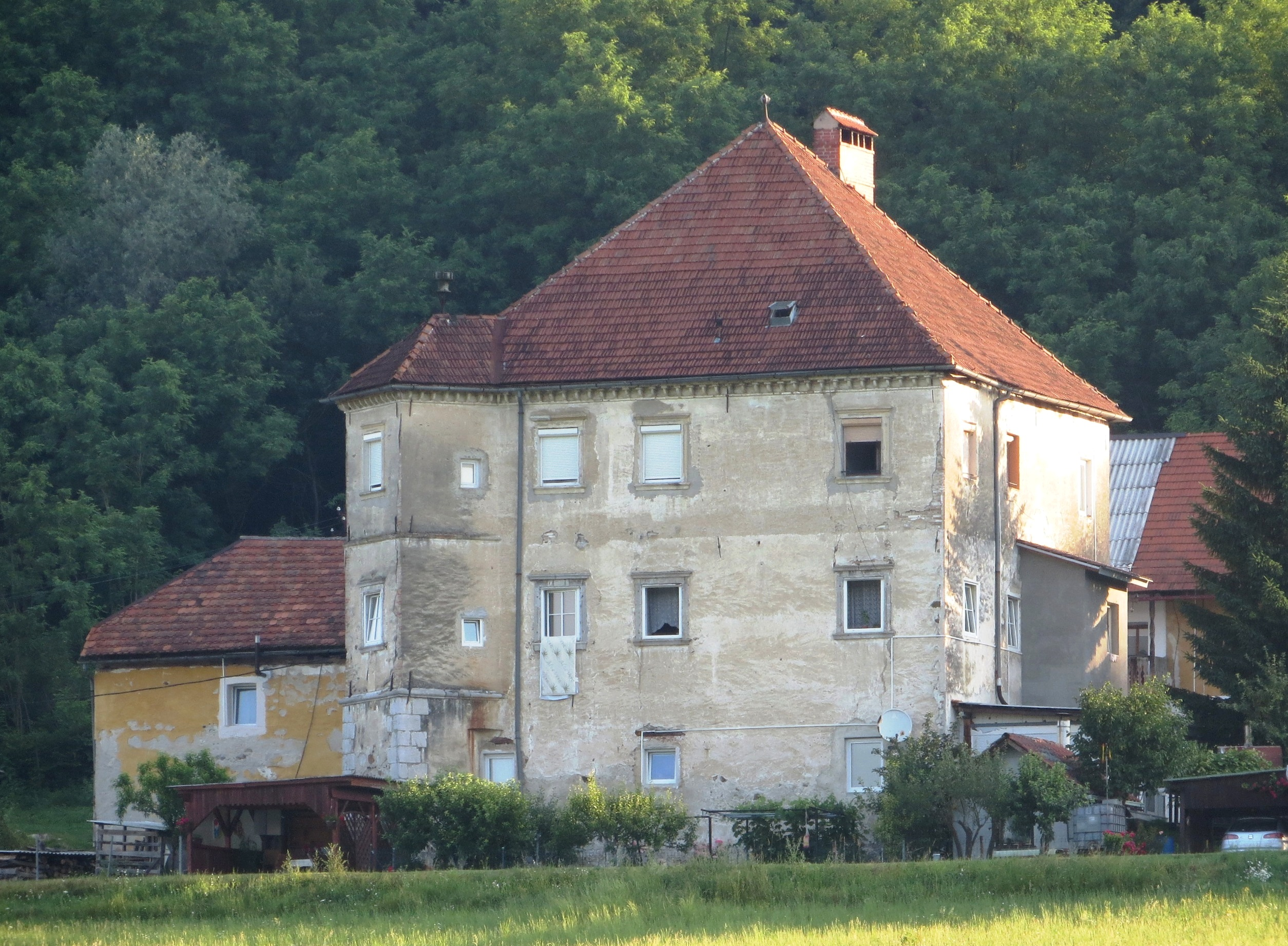
View from the southeast

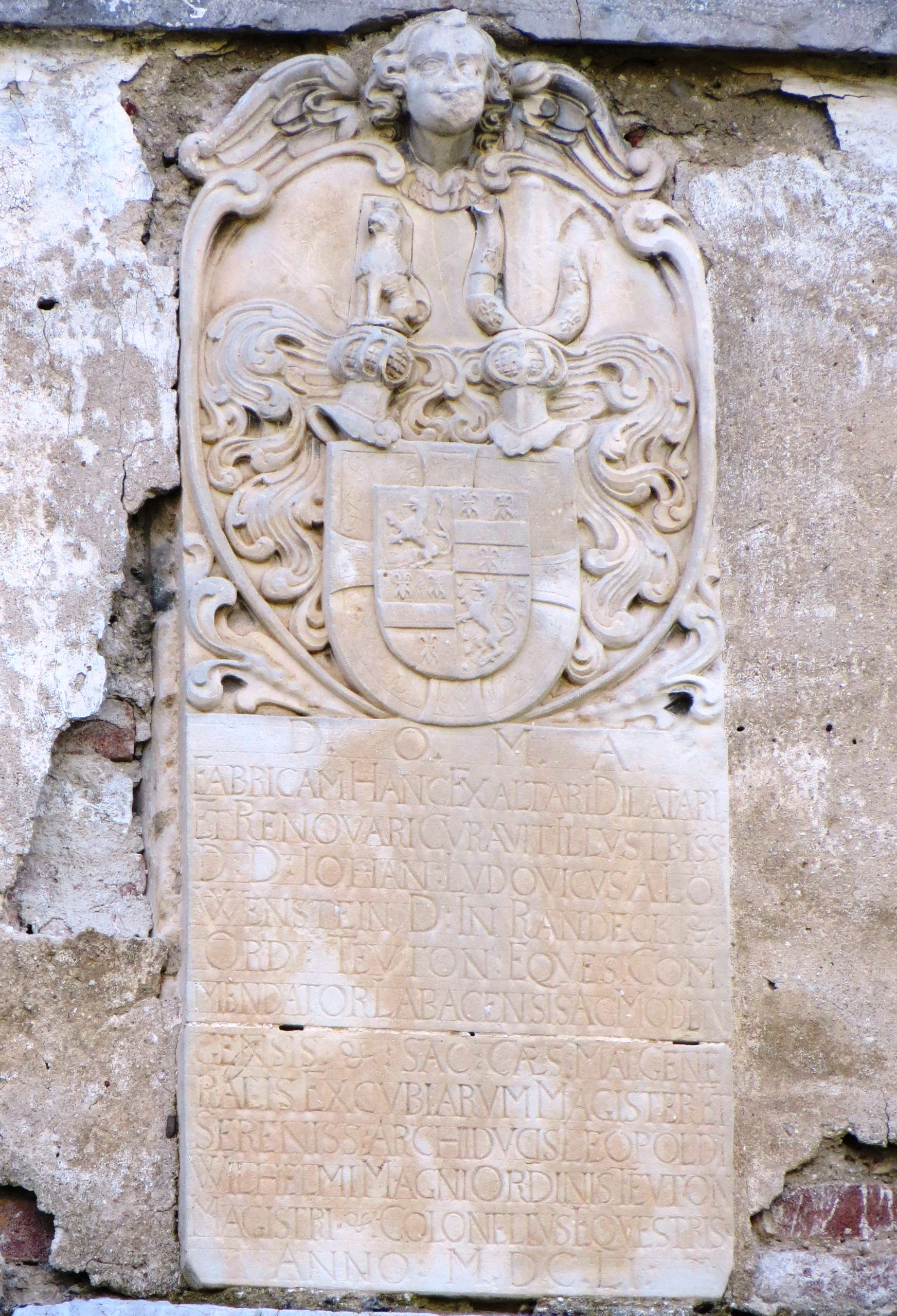
Crest

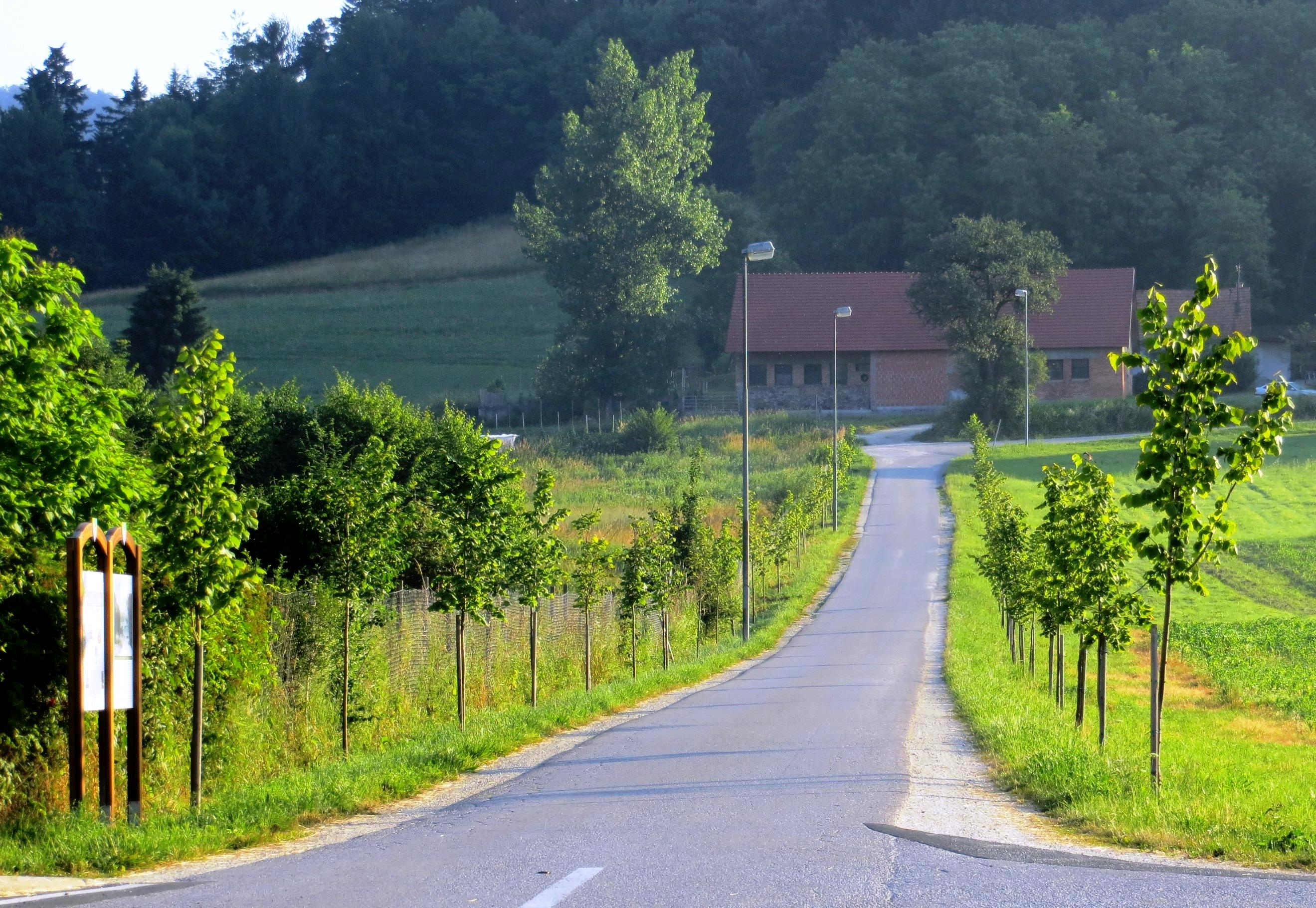
Replanted tree-lined avenue

Žerjav Castle

Žerjav Castle is a 16th-century manor. It was built in 1580 by Lenart Frumentin, a priest in the Teutonic Knights. There is a stone plaque with a crest above the manor entrance. Next to the stall belonging to the castle is a well with an inscription stating that it was installed in 1591. Ownership of the manor was later assumed by the Austrian Empire, which in turn deeded it to the Račič family for its services during its war against the Republic of Venice. The castle was nationalized after the Second World War. A tree-lined avenue formerly stood along the route from Dolsko to the manor, with heritage cultivars of pears on the right and apples on the left. It was cut down in the 1950s. The avenue was replanted with linden trees in 2012.

== Church ==
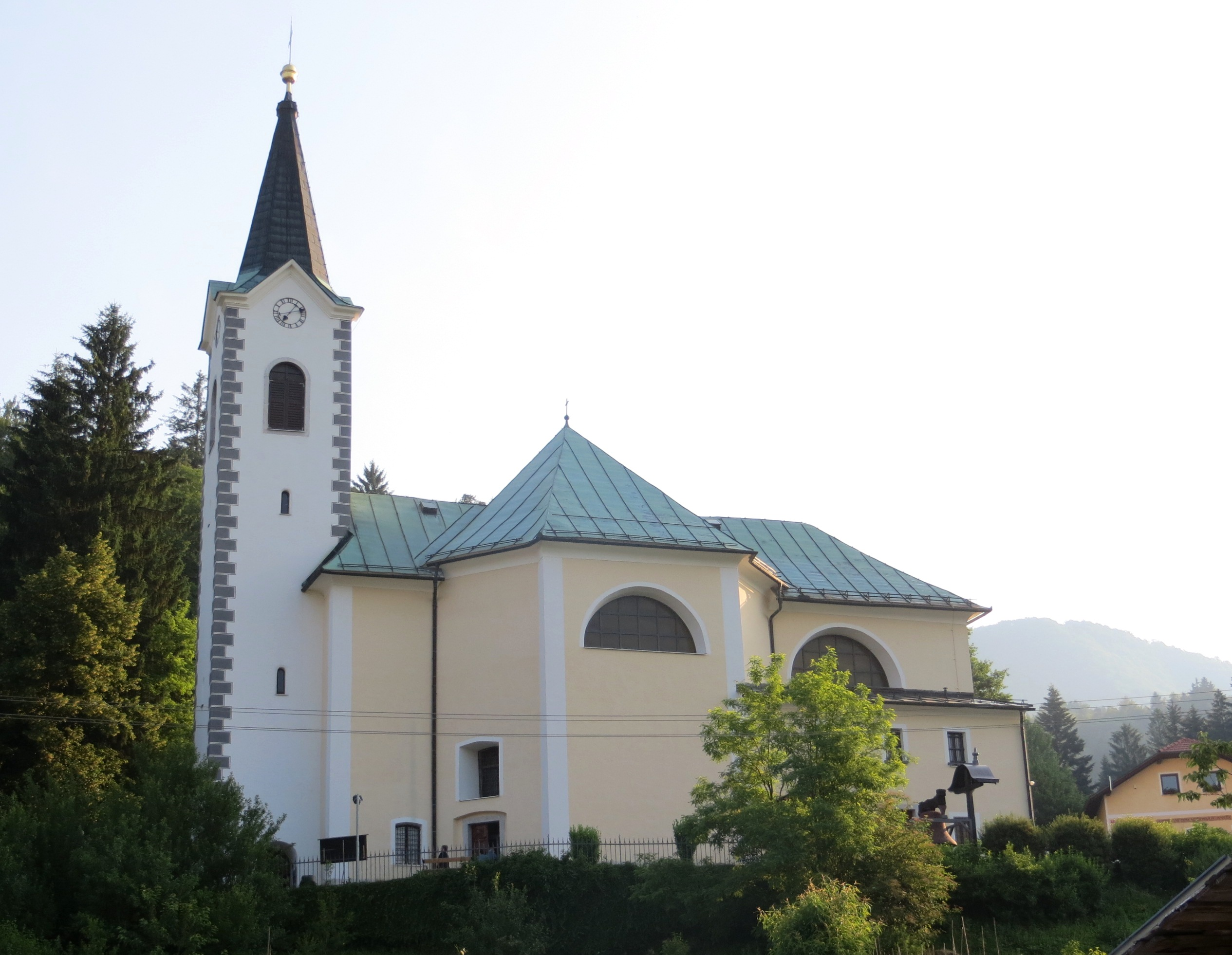
South view of church

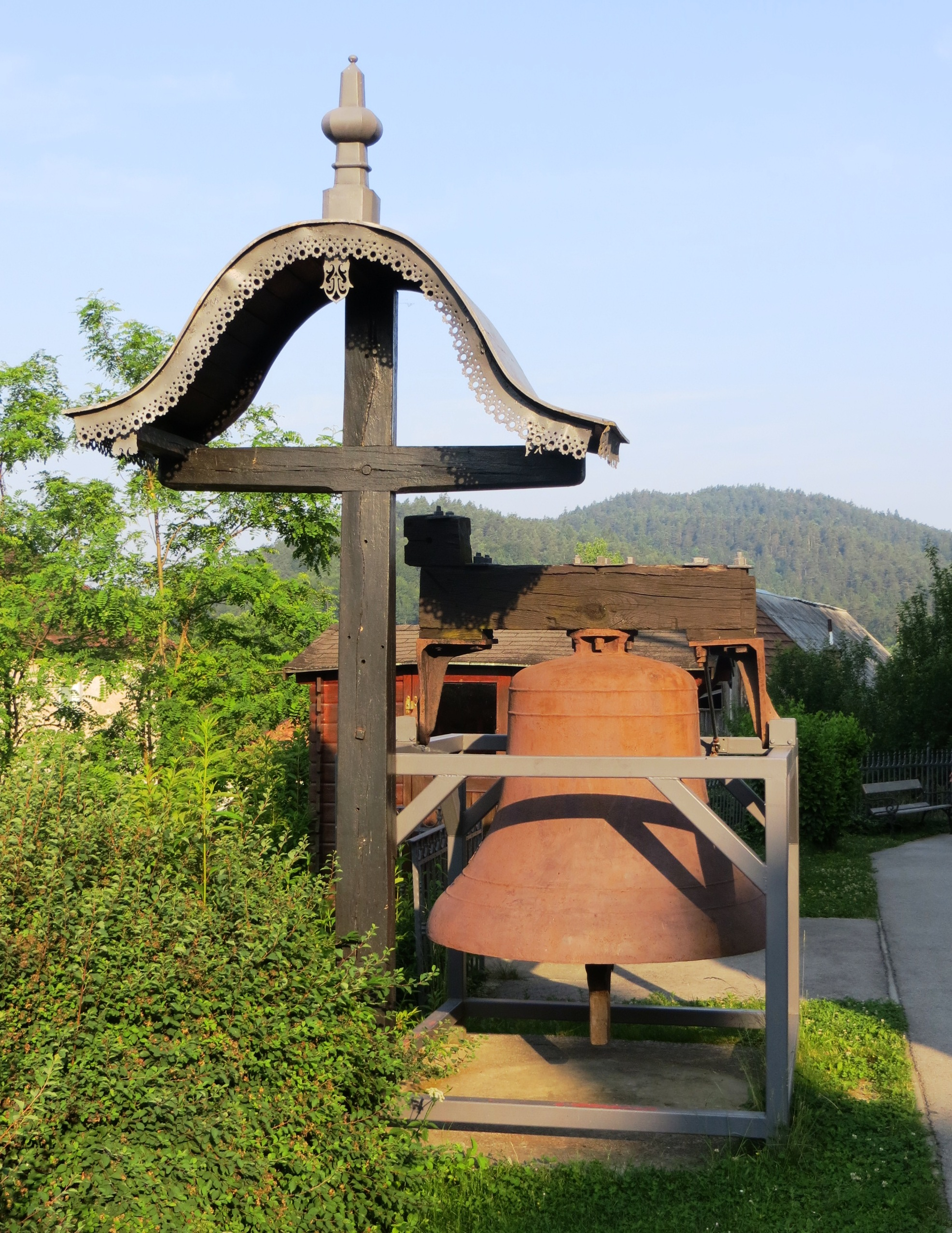
Cross and bell

Saint Helena's Church

The local church stands next to Žerjav Castle and is dedicated to Saint Helena. The church was first mentioned in written sources in 1495, and the first church at the site was built by the owners of Žerjav Castle. Tradition states that it was dedicated to Saint Helena by the lady of the castle, who was named Helena. The original church was razed in the late 18th century, and the new structure was built between 1794 and 1797. The main altar features a painting of Saint Helena by Ivan Grohar. The side altars have paintings by Marko Layer (1727–1808) and Henrika Langus (1836–1876), and there is a painting of the Holy Sepulcher by Matija Koželj. An old painting of the Virgin Mary by an unknown artist hangs in the sacristy. Kamnica was elevated to a parish in 1875.
