= Slovenian euro coins =

Designs of Slovenian currency

Slovenian euro coins were first issued for circulation on 1 January 2007 and a unique feature is designed for each coin. The design of approximately 230 million Slovenian euro coins (total value of approximately €80 million) was unveiled on 7 October 2005. The designers were Miljenko Licul, Maja Licul and Janez Boljka. The Mint of Finland was chosen to mint the coins through an international tender in 2007.

Slovenia was the first country to join the eurozone out of the 10 new member states that joined the European Union in 2004, and the first ex-Yugoslav republic to join the eurozone.

== Slovenian euro design ==
For images of the common side and a detailed description of the coins, see euro coins.

The Slovenian euro coins were the first to feature a new common side, with a new map of Europe on the bicoloured and Nordic-gold coins.

Depiction of Slovenian euro coinage | Obverse side
€0.01	€0.02	€0.05
A stork, a motif taken from the former 20 SIT coin	The Prince's stone, where Carantanian dukes were installed	Ivan Grohar's painting The Sower sowing stars
€0.10	€0.20	€0.50
Jože Plečnik's idea for the national parliament, with the inscription Katedrala svobode (Cathedral of Freedom)	A pair of Lipizzaner horses with the inscription Lipicanec (Lipizzaner)	Triglav, constellation of Cancer^{1} and inscription from Jakob Aljaž's song "Oj Triglav moj dom" (O Triglav, My Home).
€1	€2	€2 Coin Edge
		S L O V E N I J A
Primož Trubar, Slovenian Protestant reformer, and the inscription Stati inu obstati (To Exist and Persevere)	France Prešeren, Slovenian Romantic poet, and the first line of the 7th stanza of Zdravljica (Slovenian national anthem)	S L O V E N I J A

^{1} Slovenia achieved independence under the zodiac sign of Cancer.

== Circulating mintage quantities ==
The following table shows the mintage quantity for all Slovenian euro coins, per denomination, per year.

Face Value	€0.01	€0.02	€0.05	€0.10	€0.20	€0.50	€1.00	€2.00
2007	44,700,000	44,500,000	43,800,000	42,800,000	37,250,000	32,400,000	29,750,000	21,350,000
2008	**150,000**	**150,000**	**150,000**	**150,000**	**150,000**	**150,000**	**150,000**	**150,000**
2009	18,000,000	12,400,000	**100,000**	**100,000**	**100,000**	**100,000**	**100,000**	**100,000**
2010	**75,000**	**75,000**	**75,000**	**75,000**	**75,000**	**75,000**	**75,000**	**75,000**
2011	**17,000**	**17,000**	**17,000**	**17,000**	**17,000**	**17,000**	**17,000**	**17,000**
2012	**17,000**	**17,000**	**17,000**	**17,000**	**17,000**	**17,000**	**17,000**	**17,000**
2013	**17,000**	**17,000**	**17,000**	**17,000**	**17,000**	**17,000**	**17,000**	**17,000**
2014	**16,500**	**16,500**	**16,500**	**16,500**	**16,500**	**16,500**	**16,500**	**16,500**
2015	10,015,000	**15,000**	**15,000**	**15,000**	**15,000**	**15,000**	**15,000**	**15,000**
2016	25,012,000	**12,000**	**12,000**	**12,000**	**12,000**	**12,000**	**12,000**	**12,000**
2017	**9,000**	**9,000**	**9,000**	**9,000**	**9,000**	**9,000**	**9,000**	**9,000**
2018	16,008,750	6,008,750	**8,750**	3,008,750	**8,750**	**8,750**	**8,750**	**8,750**
2019	38,008,750	22,008,750	17,008,750	22,008,750	8,008,750	**8,750**	**8,750**	**8,750**
2020	14,007,500	11,007,500	**7,500**	**7,500**	**7,500**	**7,500**	**7,500**	4,007,500
2021	13,006,500	7,006,500	7,006,500	8,006,500	**6,500**	4,006,500	**6,500**	3,006,500
2022	9,006,500	5,006,500	4,006,500	13,006,500	5,006,750	**6,500**	**6,500**	3,006,500
2023	4,006,750	6,006,750	12,006,750	5,006,750	17,006,750	**6,750**	**6,750**	3,006,500
**Bold** = Small quantities minted for sets only.

=== Mints ===
2007: Finland
2008: Netherlands
2009–2011: Finland
2012–2013: Slovakia
2014–2018: Netherlands

== €2 commemorative coins ==
Year	Subject	Volume

== Other commemorative coins (collectors' coins) ==
Slovenia joined the Eurozone on January 1, 2007. In such a short time they have already built a small collection of collectors coins, with face values ranging from 3 to 100 euros. Although they are all legal tender in Slovenia, these coins are not really intended to be used as a means of payment, so they do not circulate widely (the only exception is the 3 euro coins which can be found in circulation although extremely rarely).

== Selection process for the national side ==
The first stage of the selection process started in April 2004, involving preliminary discussions with numismatists, designers and experts. The general public was also invited through the mass media to participate in a public tender concerning proposals of motifs (132 tenderers proposed 699 motifs). A special expert commission (9 different individual experts and members of different institutions, including the Ministry of Finance and the Bank of Slovenia) dealt with the proposals and the process. The second stage of selection started when the Government of the Republic of Slovenia confirmed the commission's decision that invitations would be addressed to some prominent designers for the production of designs.

The commission invited five well-known Slovene designers. A special jury of reputable Slovene artists, designers, professors and connoisseurs of Slovene cultural heritage was appointed to review and assess the designs submitted for the Slovene euro coins. The commission of the Bank of Slovenia and Ministry of Finance unanimously agreed with the proposed selected designs prepared by Mr Miljenko Licul, along with Ms Maja Licul and Mr Janez Boljka. The Government of the Republic of Slovenia gave their consent and adopted the decision on 28 July 2005 to submit the selected design proposals for the national side of the Slovene euro coins to ECOFIN (Economic and Financial Committee) - Coins Sub-Committee, which acknowledged the compliance of the Slovene design proposals with European legislation on 5 October 2005.

== Controversy ==
The use of the Prince's Stone (Slovene: Knežji kamen, German: Fürstenstein) on the 2-cent coin caused a minor political stir in the Austrian State of Carinthia. The stone, a fragment of an ancient Roman column from nearby Virunum that was used in the ritual of installing the princes of Carantania and later of the Duchy of Carinthia, is kept in a museum in Klagenfurt (Slovene: Celovec), the Carinthian capital, where it is also considered a historical icon of the state. The Carinthian state government (headed by governor Jörg Haider) issued a resolution of protest on 25 October 2005, which was rejected as "not to be taken seriously" by the then Slovenian foreign minister, Dimitrij Rupel. However, there were also objections against its use on the Slovene side. On academic grounds, for instance, Peter Štih, professor of history at the Ljubljana University and member of the Slovene Academy of Sciences, argued that the Prince's Stone cannot be considered a Slovenian but rather a Carinthian historic symbol.

== See also ==
- Adoption of the euro in Slovenia
