= Matija Jama =

Slovene painter

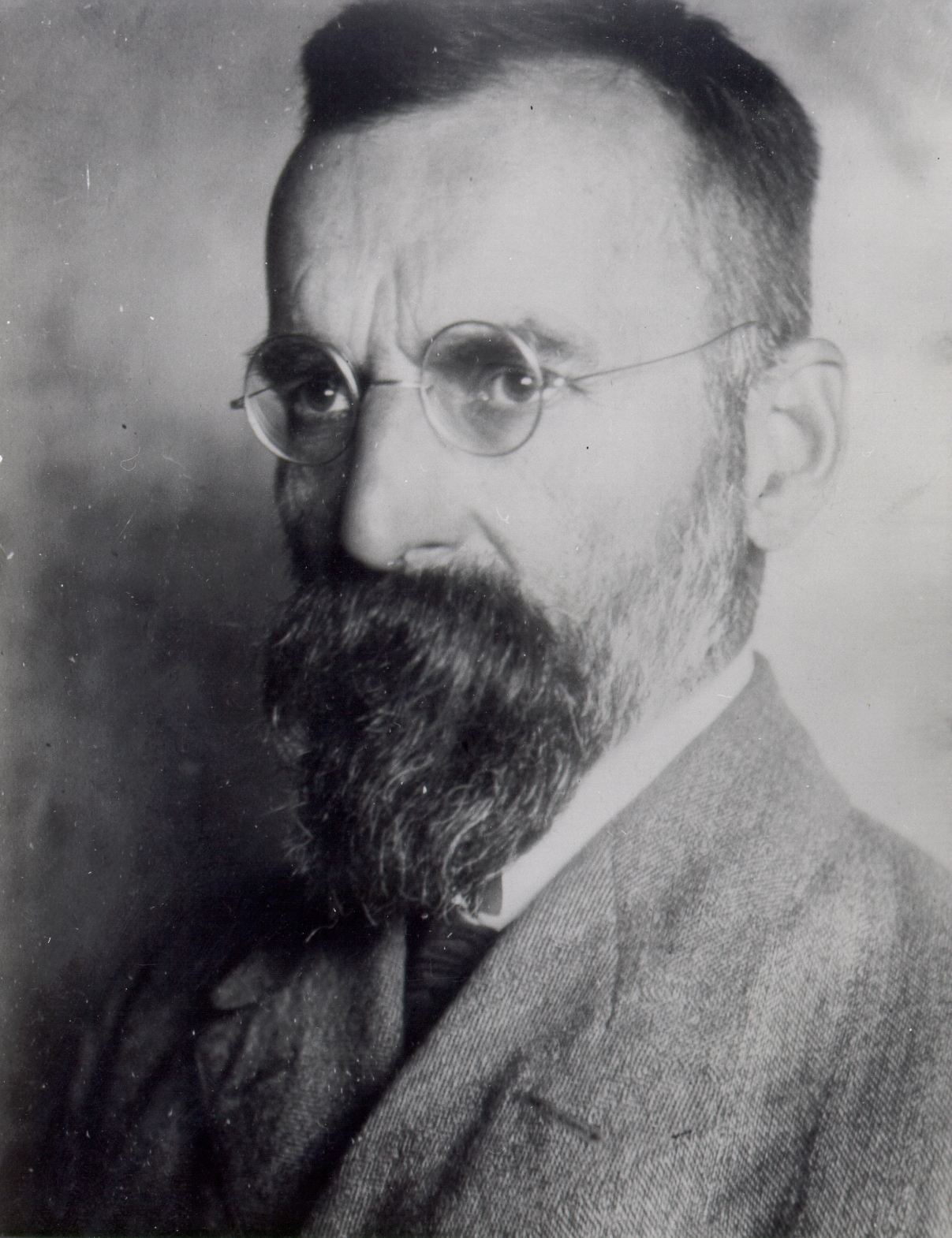
Matija Jama in the 1930s

Matija Jama (4 January 1872 – 6 April 1947) was a Slovene painter. Together with Rihard Jakopič, Ivan Grohar and Matej Sternen, he is considered among the best representatives of Impressionism in the Slovene Lands.

== Life ==
Jama was born in Ljubljana, where he attended primary school and lower grammar school. He then moved with his family to Zagreb, where he began to show an interest in painting when in higher grammar school. After finishing grammar school, he enrolled in the law faculty, but in 1890 he quit his studies and left for Munich, where he enrolled in a private art school. Two years later, he returned to Ljubljana, where he made a living with his drawings. During this time, he drew illustrations for the journal Dom in svet.

With the support of the Carniolan Provincial Diet, he returned to Munich in 1897, where he enrolled in Anton Ažbe's art school. The following year, he enrolled at the Munich artistic academy, but he did not finish his studies there. In 1902, he married the Dutch painter Louise van Raders. Jama lived and worked in different places throughout Europe: Austria, Croatia, Germany and the Netherlands. Later, he returned to the Slovene Lands, where he lived for a while in Bled and in Volčji Potok. Finally, he settled in Rašica and then in Ljubljana.

Besides oil paintings, Jama also drew designs for posters and illustrations. Among others, he illustrated the first editions of several books by the famous modernist writer Ivan Cankar. His idols in his later life, when he had "grown out" of his Secessionist period, were Italian and French Impressionists, amongst whom the most influential was Claude Monet. In his prime, Jama was essentially a landscape painter. Even the illustrations and commissioned portraits that he produced at the start of his artistic career feature vedute.

In his later period, Jama worked together with other Slovene impressionists, in particular with Rihard Jakopič, with whom he worked in Donji Čemehovec and Kraljevec na Sutli. It was at this time that Jama began to study light and became a true impressionist. In this last period of Slovene impressionism, he painted first and foremost with watercolour, but he gave this up around 1900 and devoted himself to painting using oil on canvas. He produced the majority of his best-known works with this technique, which he used until the end of his life.

== Selected paintings ==
Among some 450 paintings made by Jama the most notable include:

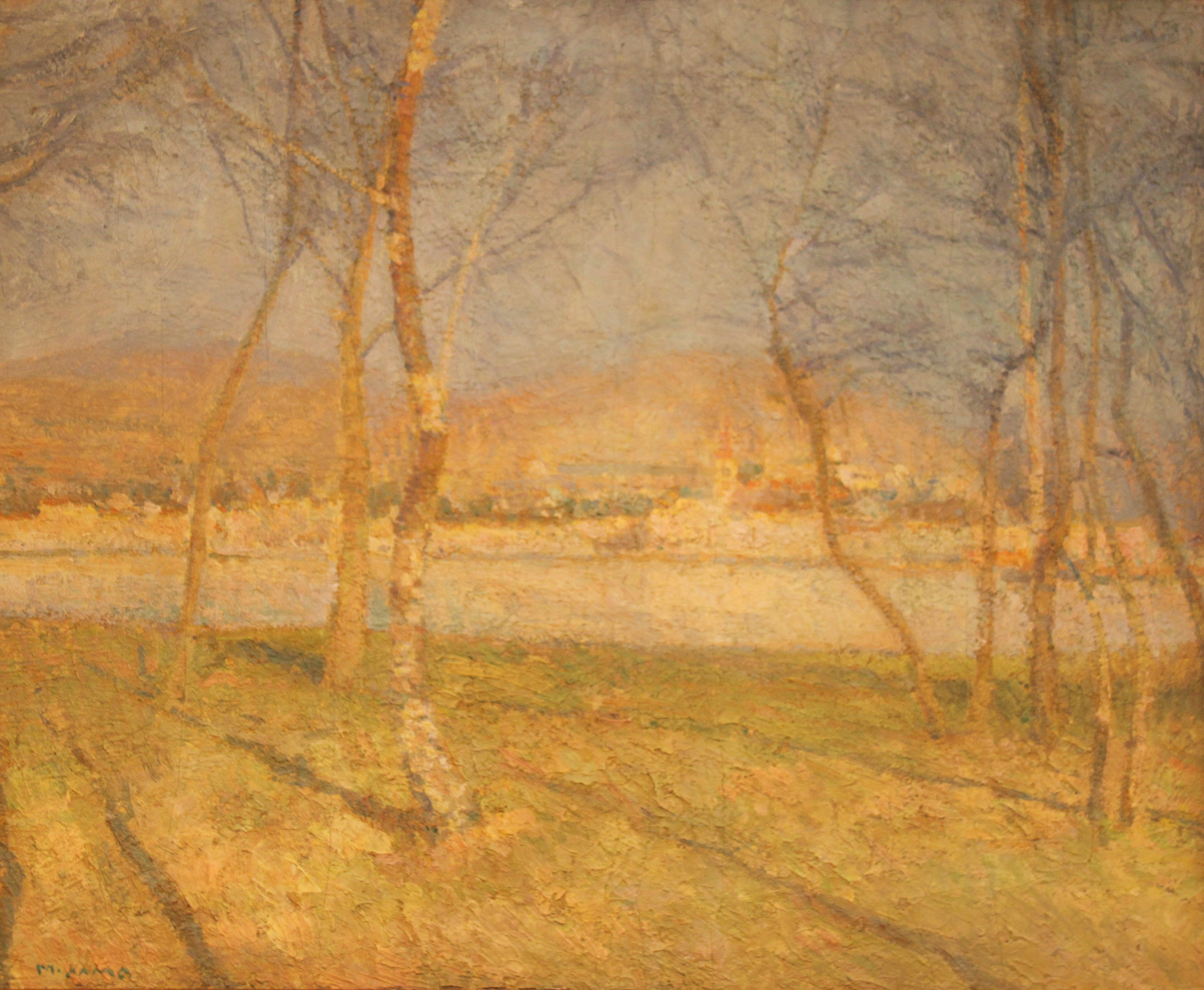
At Blejsko jezero in spring

- At meal ("Pri obedu")
- Garden ("Vrt")
- Bridge on Dobra ("Most na Dobri")
- By the river in spring/ spring-landscape with city at Blejsko jezero
- Willow Trees ("Vrbe")
- Ljubljana in Snow ("Ljubljana v snegu")
- Saint Michlaus ("Šenklavž")
- Croatian Farmer ("Hrvaški kmet")
- Wheel dance ("Kolo")
- Village in Winter ("Vas v zimi")
- Blossoming Apple Tree ("Cvetoča jablana")
- Red Parasol ("Rdeči parazol")
- On the Divan ("Na divanu")
