= Miljenko Licul =

Slovenian graphic designer

Miljenko Licul (6 August 1946 – 16 March 2009) was a Slovenian graphic designer of Croatian descent. He was one of the most prominent graphic designers in independent Slovenia.

== Life and work ==
Licul was born in the Istrian town of Vodnjan, which was then part of the Yugoslav occupation zone of the Julian March (now in Croatia). His parents were Istrian Croats. He moved to Slovenia in his youth and lived and worked there most of his life.

He was a founder of the group Znak, and leader of studios Zodiak and Diptih. For some time, Licul taught typography at the Academy of Fine Arts and Design in Ljubljana. Licul's work covers a wide spectrum of arts; from designing publications, posters and magazine covers to postage stamps and calendars.

One of his most prominent career highlights was in 1991, when he won the contest for designing new Slovenian currency, the tolar. The banknotes, which were in circulation from October 1991 until the end of 2006, featured portraits of prominent Slovenian personalities, the work of painter Rudi Španzel. When Slovenia adopted the euro as the national currency, Licul designed the national side of Slovenian euro coins, together with Maja Licul and Janez Boljka. Licul and Boljka designed tolar coins together, as well.

Besides the national currency, Licul also designed several official documents, such as the Slovenian passport, identity card and health insurance card. His other works include the designing of a new graphic image for the Slovenian National Gallery.

== Awards ==
For his opus, Licul was awarded several prizes. In 1985 he received the Prešeren Foundation Award for his achievements in graphic design. In 1988 Licul won the Plečnik Award, the highest award in the field of design, architecture and urban planning in Slovenia. In 2008 he was awarded the Prešeren Award, the highest Slovenian national prize in the field of arts, together with translator Janez Gradišnik. On that particular occasion, it was substantiated that Licul's works were of highest quality and that he was among the authors who renewed the strictly modernistic style of the 1970s, without omitting the historical features.
