= Pavel Golia =

Poet, playwright (1887–1959)

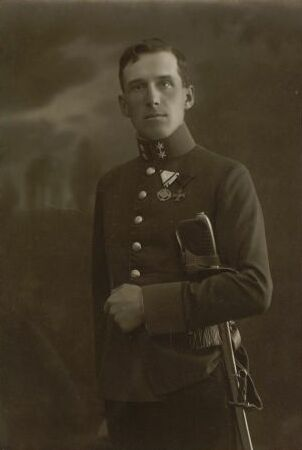
Pavel Golia, photo by Avgust Berthold

Pavel Golia (10 April 1887 – 15 August 1959) was a Slovenian poet and playwright.

== Life ==
Pavel Golia was born in a relatively wealthy family in Trebnje. Between 1907 and 1915, he served as an officer in the Austro-Hungarian Army. In 1918, he was a journalist in Moscow. Later, he worked as a dramaturge or manager of the national theaters in Ljubljana (1920–46, with a two-year break), Osijek, and Belgrade. He died in Ljubljana.

== Work ==
Golia wrote his first collection of poems, titled Alkohol ("Alcohol"), in 1908. It was published only in 1914. He wrote poems for about 40 years. According to the literary historian Igor Grdina, Golia was an intimate poet who wrote about alcoholism, prostitution, and deviant people. Emotions in his poetry are not serious. He was influenced by Oton Župančič, but developed his own form, sometimes closer to artistry.

Golia has been praised for his plays, particularly the ones written for children. He published his first play Peterčkove poslednje sanje: božična povest v štirih slikah s prologom ("Peter's Final Dreams: A Christmas Play in Four Images with a Prologue") in 1923. His most known children plays are Princeska in pastirček ("A Princess and a Shepherd Boy"), Jurček ("Little George"), Srce igrač ("The Heart of Toys"), Uboga Ančka ("Poor Little Annie"), and Sneguljčica ("Snow White"). The expert in Slovenian youth literature Igor Saksida placed him among the best Slovenian children's playwrights.

== Commemoration ==
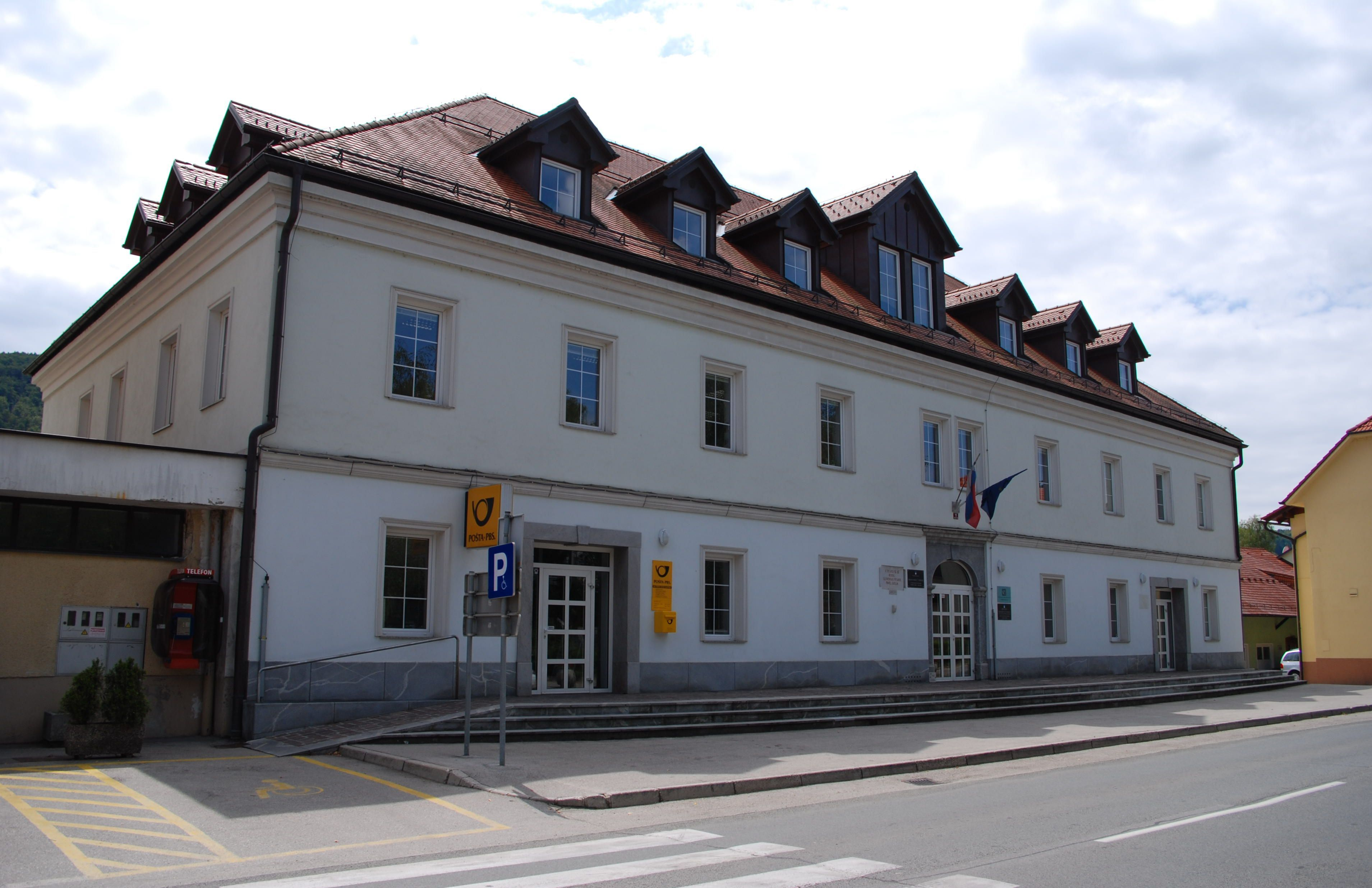
Pavel Golia's birth house in Trebnje

The Municipality of Trebnje celebrates 10 April as Pavel Golia Memorial Day. The library in Trebnje is named after him.
