= Adoption of the euro in Slovenia =

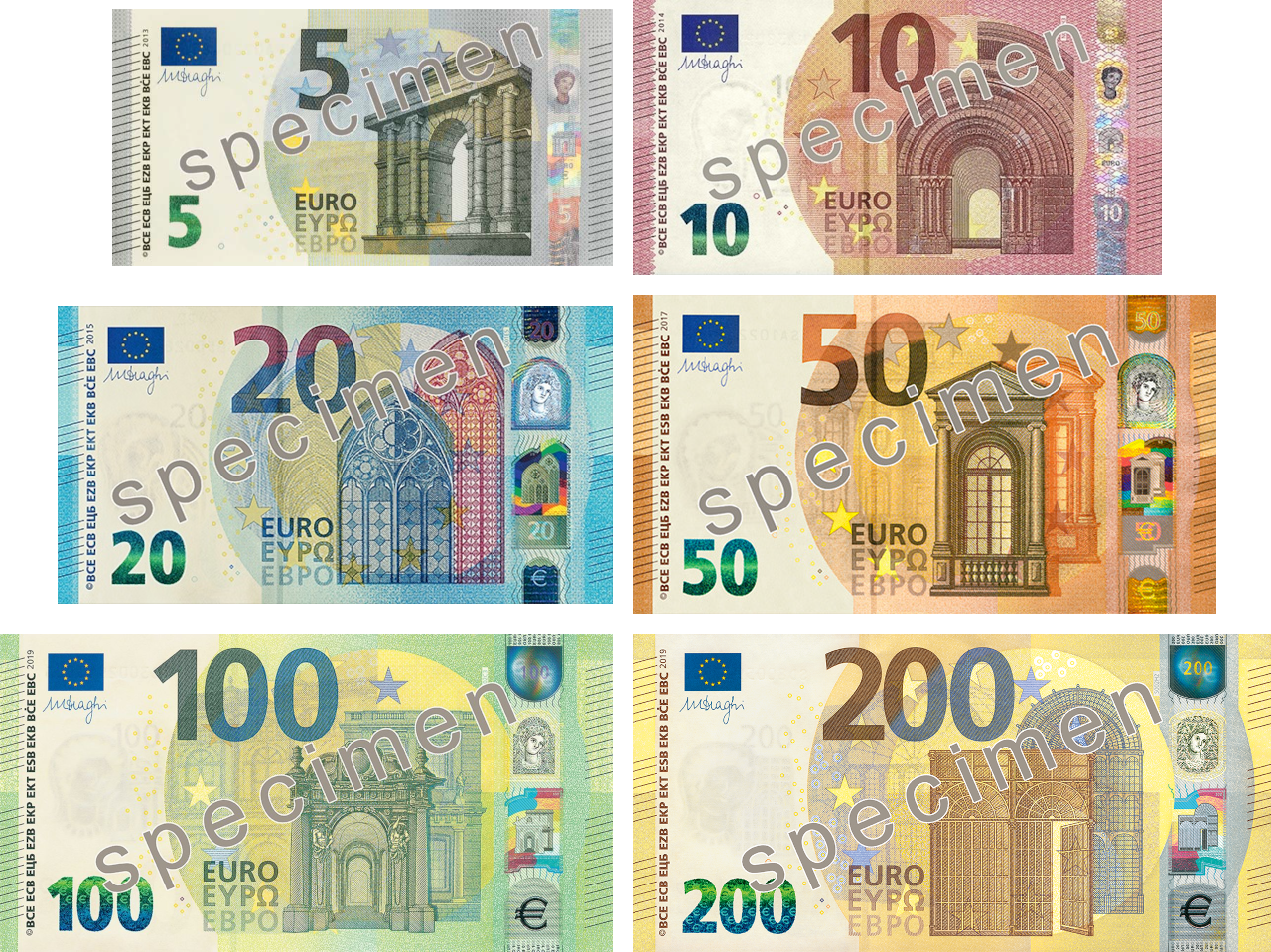
- Euro banknotes - all denominations
- Date: 1 January 2007 (introduction) – 14 January 2007 (complete transition).
- Location: Slovenia
- Type: Economic transition
- Theme: Adoption of the euro as the national currency
- Participants: Government of Slovenia, European Union
- Outcome: Replacement of the Slovenian tolar with the euro

Eurozone participation European Union member states (special territories not shown) 21 in the eurozone 1 in ERM II, with an opt-out (Denmark) 5 not in ERM II, but committed to join the eurozone after meeting the convergence criteria (Czech Republic, Hungary, Poland, Romania, and Sweden) Non–EU member states 4 using the euro with a monetary agreement (Andorra, Monaco, San Marino, and Vatican City) 2 using the euro unilaterally (Kosovo and Montenegro)

Slovenia was the first of the countries from the 2004 enlargement of the European Union to adopt the euro, which had become the official currency of the eurozone in 2007. Slovenia had previously used the Slovenian tolar as its national currency, and this was entirely replaced with the euro following a short dual-circulation period.

== History ==
=== Conceptualization of the euro on European level ===
Slovenia submitted its membership application to the European Union on 10 June 1996 and simultaneously signed a Europe Agreement with the European Union, which came into force on 1 February 1999. This agreement formed the legal basis for EU-Slovenia relations. The country's economic development and its capacity to adopt the acquis communautaire (accumulated law of the EU) positioned it as a likely first qualifier for EU admission, with accession negotiations beginning on 30 March 1998.

Slovenia implemented a special accession partnership and presented its national programme for adopting the acquis in March 1998. This programme outlined the necessary measures to meet the targets of the accession partnership, focusing on short-term objectives. An analytical assessment ("screening") of various sections of the acquis communautaire began in April 1998, leading to negotiations and the closure of 12 out of 32 negotiating chapters.

=== Process of euro adoption in Slovenia ===
Slovenia's transition to the euro involved several critical stages, including fulfilling the Copenhagen criteria, maintaining macroeconomic stability, and making progress in economic liberalization. While Slovenia met the political criteria set by the EU, the European Commission noted that the legislative process was somewhat slow, impacting the transposition of the acquis communautaire and affecting the country's judicial capacity. Economically, Slovenia had an established market economy and made strides in liberalizing administered prices. The country was advised to modernize its legal environment for business to cope with competitive pressures within the Union.

With regards to adopting the acquis communautaire, Slovenia showed considerable efforts in most areas, such as the internal market, justice, and home affairs. A suitable legal framework was needed for state aid, agriculture, and the free movement of persons, capital, and services. The official introduction of the euro in Slovenia occurred on 1 January 2007, with a dual circulation period lasting until 14 January 2007, marking the complete transition from the Slovenian tolar to the euro.

== Economic impact ==
The adoption of the euro in Slovenia was part of the country's accession to the European Union and was legally binding once Slovenia met the convergence criteria and ensured its laws were compatible with the euro area. The process in Slovenia was smooth and rapid, supported by a general political and public consensus and an efficient communication strategy. Emphasis on macroeconomic stability during the pre-accession period allowed Slovenia to address economic imbalances and meet the nominal convergence criteria.

== See also ==
- 2004 enlargement of the European Union
- Slovenian euro coins
- Slovenian tolar
- Enlargement of the eurozone
- International status and usage of the euro
- Economic and monetary union
- History of the euro
- European Currency Unit
- European Central Bank
- European Union
- European Economic Community
- History of Slovenia
