= Slovenian tolar =

Currency of Slovenia from 1991 to 2007

slovenski tolar (Slovene)

ISO 4217
- Code: SIT

Units of account
- Plural: The language(s) of this currency belong(s) to the Slavic languages. There is more than one way to construct plural forms.
- Symbol: T
- Subunit
- 1/100: stotin

Denominations
- Banknotes: 10, 20, 50, 100, 200, 500, 1000, 5000, 10,000 tolarjev
- Coins
- Freq. used: 50 stotinov, 1, 2, 5, 10, 20, 50 tolarjev
- Rarely used: 10, 20 stotinov

Demographics
- Date of introduction: 8 October 1991
- Replaced: Yugoslav dinar
- Date of withdrawal: 31 December 2006
- Replaced by: Euro
- User(s): None, previously: Slovenia

Issuance
- Central bank: Bank of Slovenia
- Website: www.bsi.si

Valuation
- Inflation: 0.8%
- Source: Bank of Slovenia, 2005
- Method: Core CPI

EU Exchange Rate Mechanism (ERM)
- Since: 28 June 2004
- Fixed rate since: 11 July 2006
- Replaced by euro, non cash: 1 January 2007
- Replaced by euro, cash: 14 January 2007
- 1 € =: 239.640 tolars
- Band: 15%
- This infobox shows the latest status before this currency was rendered obsolete.

The tolar was the currency of Slovenia from 8 October 1991 until the introduction of the euro on 1 January 2007. It was subdivided into 100 stotinov (cents). The ISO 4217 currency code for the Slovenian tolar was SIT. From October 1991 until June 1992, the acronym SLT was in use.

== History ==
The name tolar comes from Thaler, and is cognate with dollar. The tolar was introduced on 8 October 1991. It replaced the 1990 (Convertible) version of Yugoslav dinar at parity. On 28 June 2004, the tolar was pegged against the euro in the ERM II, the European Union exchange rate mechanism. All recalled banknotes can be exchanged at the central bank for current issue.

=== Phase-out ===
On 1 January 2007, the tolar was supplanted by the euro. Slovenia issues its own euro coins, like all other nations in the Eurozone.

The timescale for conversion from the tolar to the euro operated differently from the first wave of European Monetary Union (EMU). The permanent euro/tolar conversion rate was finalised on 11 July 2006 at 239.640 tolar per euro. Unlike the first wave of EMU, this period was only a day (the conversion rates were fixed on 31 December 1998 and euro non-cash payments were possible from 1 January 1999). Also unlike the first wave of EMU which had a three-year transition period (1999–2001), there was no transition period when non-cash payments could be made in both tolar and euro. The tolar was used for all transactions (cash and non-cash) until 31 December 2006 and the euro was compulsory to use for all payments (cash and non-cash) from 1 January 2007. However, as with the first wave of EMU, cash payments with the tolar could continue until 14 January 2007, but change had to be given in euros.

Coins ceased to be convertible to euros by the end of 2016, while banknotes remain exchangeable for euros indefinitely at the Bank of Slovenia.

== Coins ==
In 1992, coins were introduced in denominations of 10, 20 and 50 stotinov (10, 20 and 50 stotins), 1 tolar, 2 tolarja and 5 tolarjev (2 and 5 tolars). 10 tolarjev (10 tolars) coins were added in 2000, followed by 20 and 50 tolarjev (20 and 50 tolars) in 2003. The obverse designs all show the denomination, with animals native to Slovenia on the reverses. The coins were designed by Miljenko Licul and Zvone Kosovelj and featured reliefs of animals by Janez Boljka.

Coins of the Slovenian tolar
Image	Value	Technical parameters				Description			Issued from	Lapse
Image	Value	Diameter (mm)	Thickness (mm)	Mass (g)	Composition	Edge	Obverse	Reverse	Issued from	Lapse
	10 stotinov	16.00	1.30	0.55	Aluminium: 98% Magnesium: 2%	Smooth	Value; year of issue; Lettering: Republika; Slovenija	Olm (Proteus anguinus)	29 April 1993	2017
	20 stotinov	18.00	1.30	0.70	Aluminium: 98% Magnesium: 2%	Smooth	Value; year of issue; Lettering: Republika; Slovenija	Long-eared owl (Asio otus)	29 April 1993	2017
	50 stotinov	20.00	1.30	0.85	Aluminium: 98% Magnesium: 2%	Smooth	Value; year of issue; Lettering: Republika; Slovenija	Western honey bee (Apis mellifera)	4 January 1993	2017
	1 tolar	22.00	1.70	4.50	Copper: 78% Zinc: 20% Nickel: 2%	Reeded	Value; year of issue; Lettering: Republika; Slovenija	Brown trout (Salmo trutta fario)	4 January 1993	2017
	2 tolarja	24.00	1.70	5.40	Copper: 78% Zinc: 20% Nickel: 2%	Reeded	Value; year of issue; Lettering: Republika; Slovenija	Barn swallow (Hirundo rustica)	4 January 1993	2017
	5 tolarjev	26.00	1.70	6.40	Copper: 78% Zinc: 20% Nickel: 2%	Reeded	Value; year of issue; Lettering: Republika; Slovenija	Alpine ibex (Capra ibex)	4 January 1993	2017
	10 tolarjev	22.00	2.00	5.75	Cupronickel: Cu: 75% Ni: 25%	Reeded	Value; year of issue; Lettering: Republika; Slovenija	Horse (Equus)	19 April 2000	2017
	20 tolarjev	24.00	2.00	6.85	Cupronickel: Cu: 75% Ni: 25%	Reeded	Value; year of issue; Lettering: Republika; Slovenija	White stork (Ciconia ciconia)	7 July 2003	2017
	50 tolarjev	26.00	2.00	8.00	Cupronickel: Cu: 75% Ni: 25%	Interrupted reeding	Value; year of issue; Lettering: Republika; Slovenija	Bull (Taurus taurus)	7 July 2003	2017
For table standards, see the coin specification table.

== Banknotes ==
The first banknotes were provisional payment notes issued on 8 October 1991, in denominations of 1, 2, 5, 10, 50, 100, 200, 500, 1000, and 5000 tolarjev (0.50 and 2000 tolarjev notes were also printed, but never issued; one thousand sets with matching serial numbers were sold for 5,000 tolarjev each beginning on 6 May 2002). These notes all feature Triglav, the tallest mountain in Slovenia, on the front, and the Prince's Stone, honeycomb pattern, and Carniolan honey bee on the back.

In 1992, the Bank of Slovenia introduced the following banknotes, all of which feature notable Slovenes. The banknotes were designed by Miljenko Licul and coauthors, with portraits drawn by Rudi Španzel. They were printed by the British company De La Rue on paper produced in Radeče, Slovenia.

1992 Series
Image	Value	Euro equivalent	Dimensions (mm)	Main colour	Description		Date of	
Image	Value	Euro equivalent	Dimensions (mm)	Main colour	Obverse	Reverse	first printing	issue
	10 tolarjev	€0.04	120 × 60	Green	Primož Trubar	Ursuline Church in Ljubljana; Motif from the New Testament	15 January 1992	27 November 1992
	20 tolarjev	€0.08	126 × 63	Orange	Johann Weikhard von Valvasor	Angels from The Glory of the Duchy of Carniola by Valvasor; Segments of the map of Slovenia	15 January 1992	28 December 1992
	50 tolarjev	€0.21	132 × 66	Violet	Jurij Vega	Solar System; Slovenian Academy of Sciences and Arts	15 January 1992	19 March 1993
	100 tolarjev	€0.42	138 × 69	Yellow	Rihard Jakopič	The Sun by Jakopič; Plan of the former Jakopič Pavilion	15 January 1992	30 September 1992
	200 tolarjev	€0.83	144 × 72	Brown	Jacobus Gallus	Slovenian Philharmonic Hall; Musical notations	15 January 1992	22 February 1993
	500 tolarjev	€2.09	150 × 75	Red	Jože Plečnik	National and University Library of Slovenia	15 January 1992	30 September 1992
	1000 tolarjev	€4.17	156 × 78	Blue green	France Prešeren	Text from Zdravljica by Prešeren	15 January 1992	30 September 1992
	5000 tolarjev	€20.86	156 × 78	Brown	Ivana Kobilca	National Gallery of Slovenia; Robba fountain	1 June 1993	13 December 1993
	10 000 tolarjev	€41.73	156 × 78	Purple	Ivan Cankar	Chrysanthemum; Cankar's handwriting	28 June 1994	15 March 1995
For table standards, see the banknote specification table.

== Historical exchange rates ==
The cost of one euro in Slovenian tolars (from 1999 till 2006).

Lower number indicates the tolar has a higher value.

- SIT per EUR – 233.0 (April 2006); 239.5 (June 2005); 235.7 (November 2003); 227.3 (June 2002). From 1 January 2007 the rate was irrevocably set at 239.640 and has been finalised by the European Commission.
- SIT per USD – 193.0 (April 2006); 198.0 (June 2005); 201.3 (November 2003); 195.06 (January 2000); 181.77 (1999); 166.13 (1998); 159.69 (1997); 135.36 (1996); 118.52 (1995).

== See also ==
- Economy of Slovenia
- Adoption of the euro in Slovenia
- Slovenian euro coins
