= Rihard Jakopič =

Slovene painter (1869–1943)

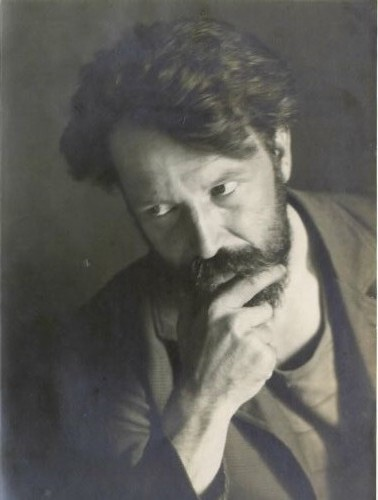
- Photo of Jakopič by Avgust Berthold, before 1919
- Born: 12 April 1869; Krakovo, Ljubljana, Carniola, Austria-Hungary
- Died: 21 April 1943 (aged 74); Ljubljana, Province of Ljubljana, Italian occupied Yugoslavia
- Education: Academy of Fine Arts Vienna; Academy of Fine Arts, Munich; Academy of Fine Arts in Prague
- Occupations: Painter; art patron; art theoretician
- Known for: Slovene Impressionist painting; Slovene School of Impressionist Drawing and Painting
- Movement: Impressionism

Rihard Jakopič (12 April 1869 – 21 April 1943) was a Slovene painter. He was the leading Slovene Impressionist painter, patron of arts and theoretician. Together with Matej Sternen, Matija Jama and Ivan Grohar, he is considered the pioneer of Slovene Impressionist painting.

== Early life and education ==
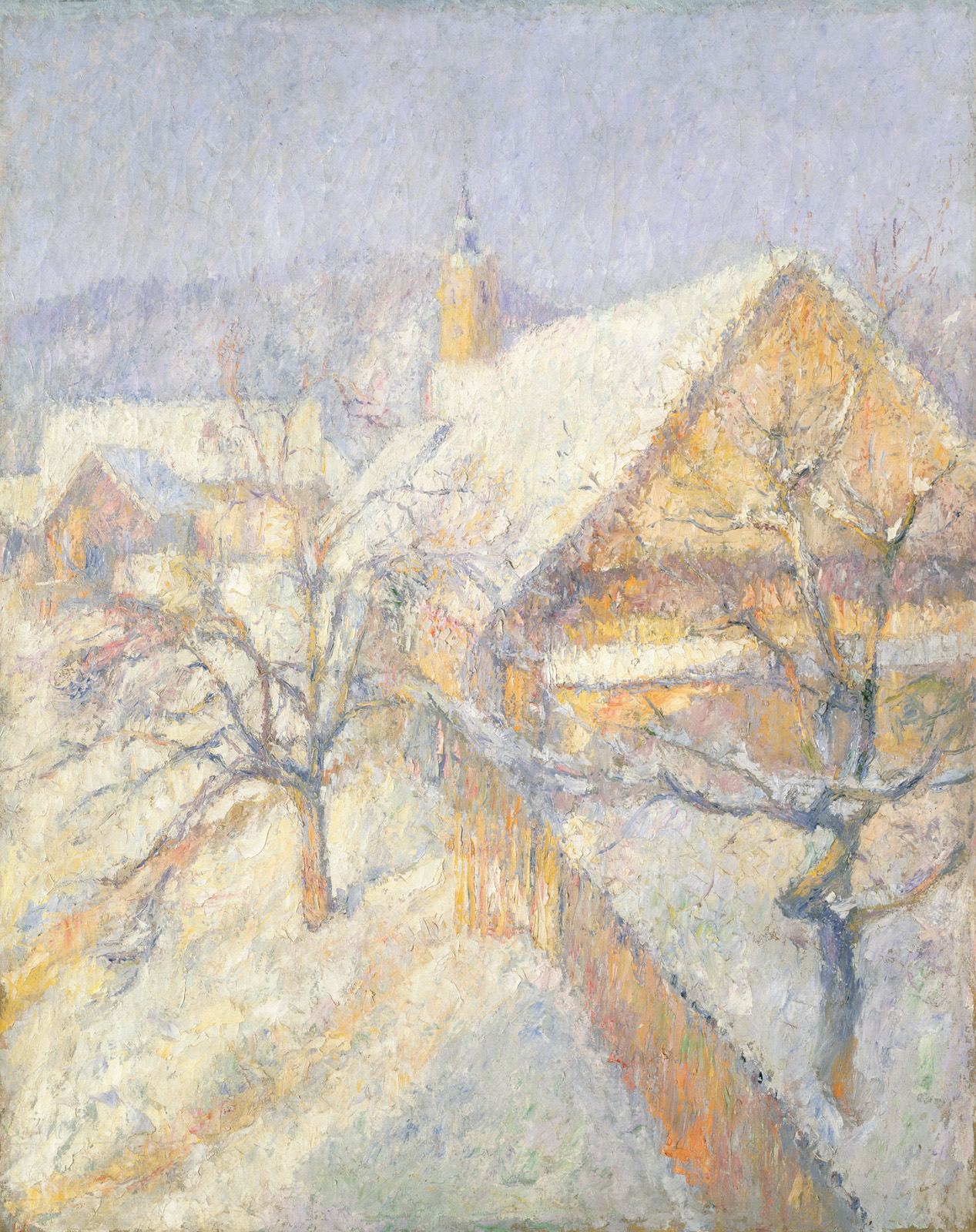
Winter

Rihard Jakopič was born in Krakovo, a suburb of Ljubljana, the capital of Carniola in the Austria-Hungary, now Slovenia. His father, Franc Jakopič, was a well-situated tradesman with agricultural goods. His mother was Neža, née Dolžan. Rihard was the youngest of eight children.

Jakopič studied at the intermediate secondary school from 1879 to 1887. After passing an entry exam, he attended the Academy of Fine Arts in Vienna, for a short time returned home due to an illness, and then resumed his studies in 1888. In 1889, he entered the Academy of Fine Arts in Munich and in 1890, the Ažbe Art School in Munich.

== Career ==
Then he lived in Ljubljana, where he participated in the establishment of the Slovene Art Society, and after 1902 in Škofja Loka. In 1903, he continued his studies at the Academy of Fine Arts in Prague. Jakopič returned to Ljubljana in 1906. He was one of the early members of the Slovenian Academy of Sciences and Arts, founded in 1938.

== Death ==
Jakopič died at his home in Ljubljana at 1:45 pm on 21 April 1943 after a long and difficult illness. A wake was held at his residence at New Square (Novi trg) no. 2, and he was buried at Holy Cross Cemetery (now Žale Cemetery) on 23 April 1943 after a ceremony at 3:30 pm at Saint Joseph's Chapel.

== Legacy ==
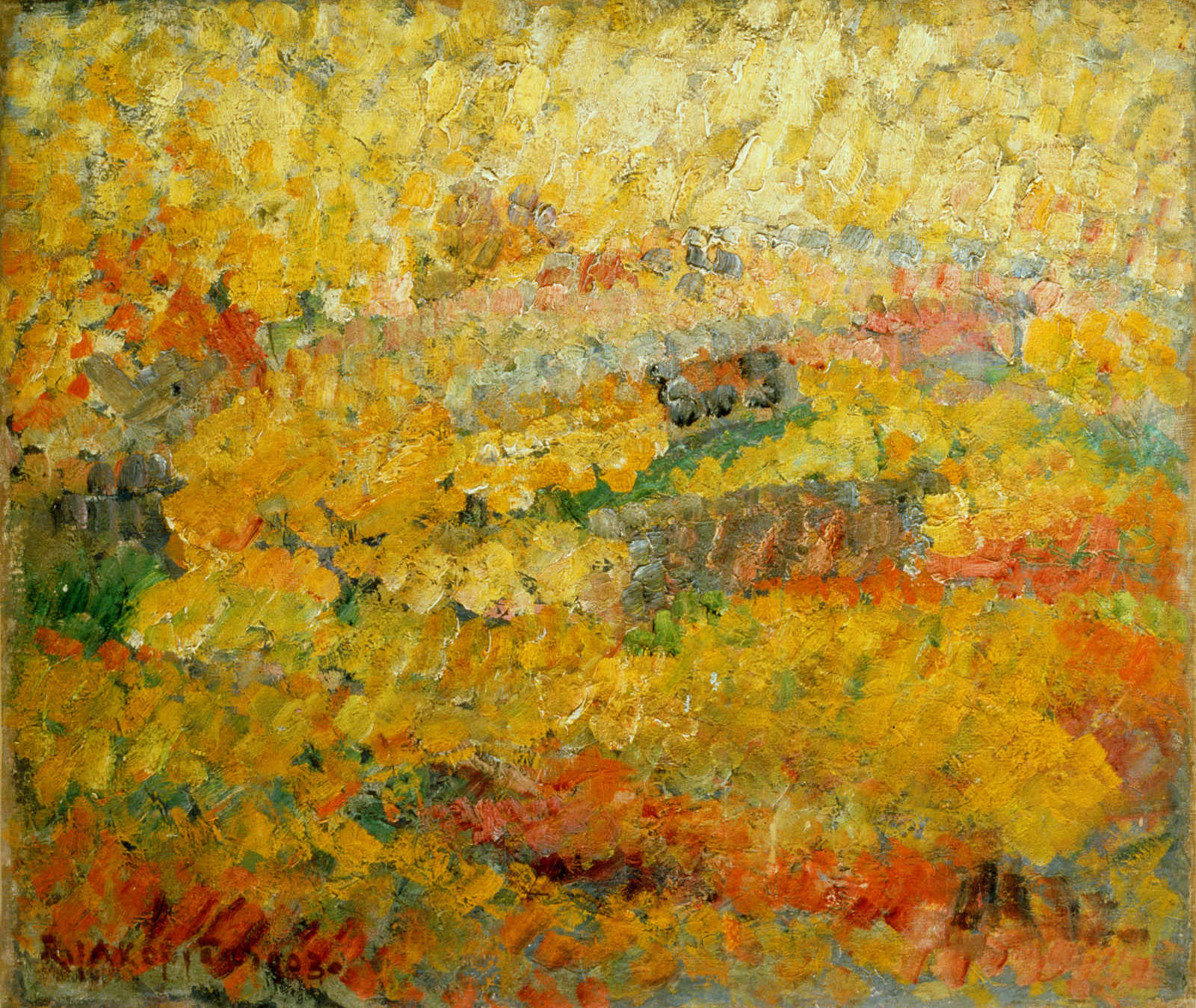
Sunny Hillside

Over 1200 paintings and 650 drawings by Jakopič have been preserved.

In Ljubljana, Jakopič established the Slovene School of Impressionist Drawing and Painting, the predecessor of the Academy of Fine Arts at the University of Ljubljana. One of his students was Mira Pintar. He was an initiator for the foundation of the National Gallery of Slovenia. In 1908, he built a pavilion in Tivoli Park, based on plans by the architect Max Fabiani. The Jakopič Pavilion became the central venue for art exhibitions in the Slovene Lands at the time. In 1962, due to the relocation of a railway line, it was demolished.

In 1965 a primary school in Šiška was named after him. Since 1969, the Jakopič Award, the highest Slovenian award in fine arts, is presented annually. In 1970–72, a statue of Jakopič by Bojan Kunaver was erected on the original site of the pavilion. In 1979, a new Jakopič Gallery (Slovene: Galerija Jakopič) opened at Slovene Street (Slovene: Slovenska cesta) in Ljubljana. After Slovenia declared independence from Yugoslavia, Jakopič was portrayed by Rudi Španzel on the 100 Slovenian tolar banknote, in circulation from October 1991 until the introduction of euro in January 2007.

== Selected works ==
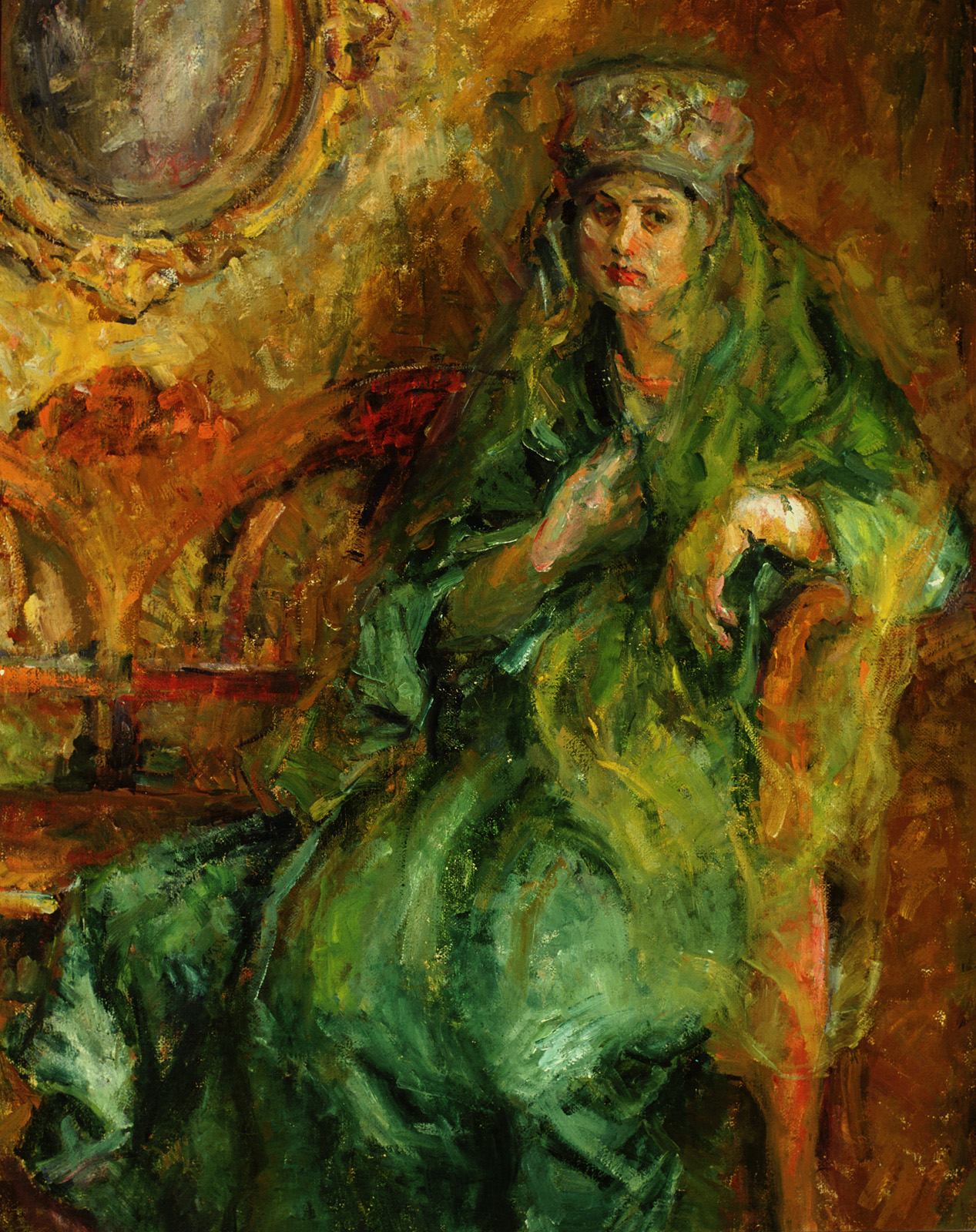
The Green Veil

- Sončni breg (Sunny Hillside; 1903), National Gallery, Ljubljana
- Breze v jeseni (Birches in Autumn; 1903), National Gallery, Ljubljana
- Kamnitnik v snegu (Kamnitnik Hill in the Snow; 1903), National Gallery, Ljubljana
- Sončni breg (Sunny Hillside; 1903), National Gallery, Ljubljana
- Zima (Winter; 1904), National Gallery, Ljubljana
- Pri svetilki (By the Lamp; 1904), National Gallery, Ljubljana
- Študija sonca (A Study of the Sun; 1905), National Gallery, Ljubljana
- Križanke (1909), National Gallery, Ljubljana
- Spomini (Memories; 1912), National Gallery, Ljubljana
- Zeleni pajčolan (The Green Veil; 1915), National Gallery, Ljubljana
- Večer na Savi (Evening on the Sava River; 1926), National Gallery, Ljubljana
- Slepec (Blind Man; 1926), National Gallery, Ljubljana
