= Jakopič Pavilion =

Art Gallery in Slovenia

Coordinates: 46°3′13.72″N 14°29′53.45″E

The Jakopič Pavilion (Slovene: Jakopičev paviljon) was an art gallery in Ljubljana, the first purpose-built art exhibition venue in the territory of modern Slovenia. It was built in 1908 by the painter Rihard Jakopič upon the plans of the architect Max Fabiani. The pavilion stood at the beginning of the Latterman Avenue in Tivoli Park. Until World War II, it was the central exhibition place of Slovene visual artists, presenting exhibitions from the fields of painting, sculpture and photography.

== History ==
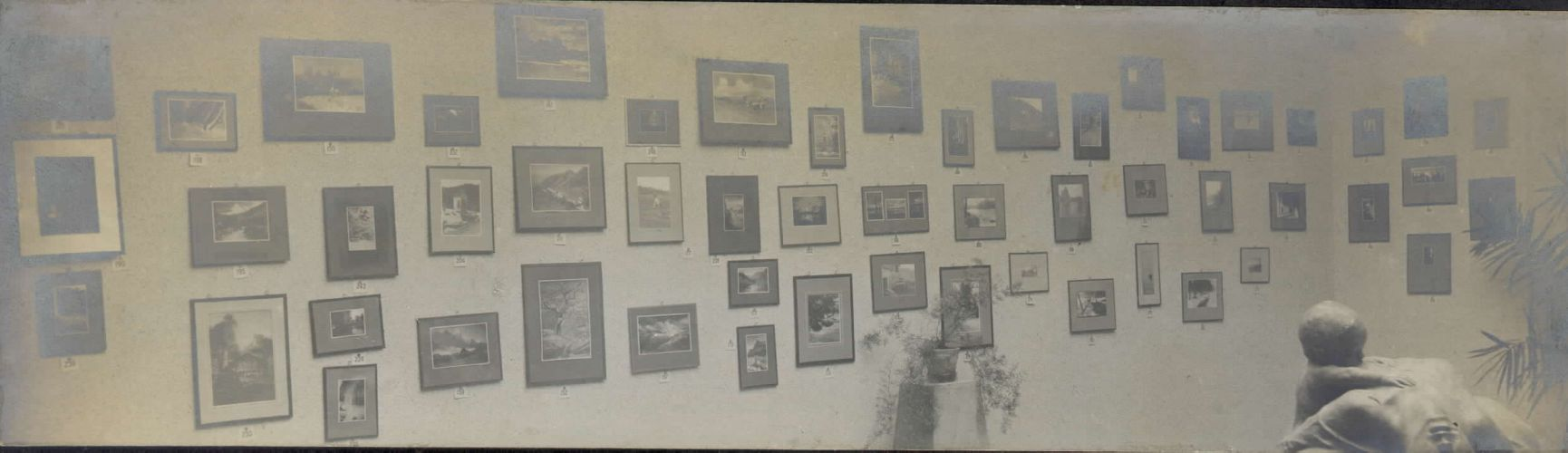
The exhibition of the Slovene Amateur Photographers' Club in the Jakopič Pavilion in 2011

Jakopič financed the construction of the building at his own expense, because he was convinced that an artist needs a constant contact with the public. Fabiani arranged plans for it gratuitously, and the city of Ljubljana leased him the estate at a symbolic price. The pavilion was built in the Vienna Secession style. It had a foyer with the great hall, on the left side it had a room for permanent exhibitions and a small studio, and on the right side it housed a drawing and painting school.

The building was solemnly opened on 12 June 1909 with the 3rd Slovene Art Exhibition, which presented 172 paintings and 20 statues of 22 artists. The following year Jakopič organised a survey exhibition titled 80 Years of Visual Arts in the Slovene Lands.

Due to the lack of money, the pavilion was bought in 1923 by the city, which gave it to the National Gallery of Slovenia. In 1954 the pavilion was renovated.

In December 1961 and January 1962 the pavilion was, despite avid protests, demolished due to the construction of the Ljubljana–Sežana railway line. This left the Jakopič Pavilion without its headquarters. In 1962, the institution was renamed to Ljubljana City Art Museum and the construction of a new headquarters building started at 5 Town Square.

The pavilion has been commemorated by a portrait statue of Rihard Jakopič, created by Bojan Kunaver.
