= Puštal =

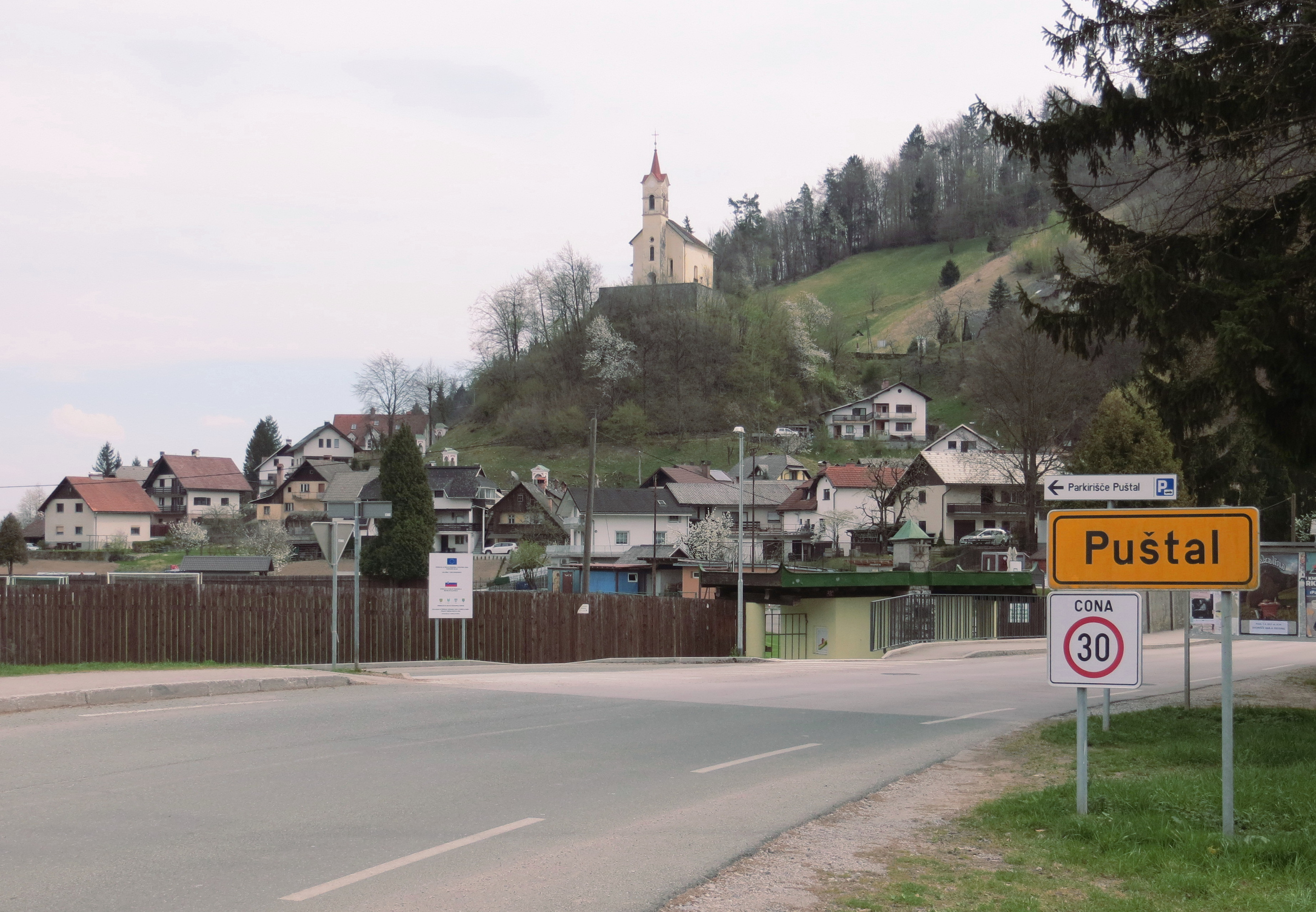

- Location in Slovenia
- Coordinates: 46°9′46.29″N 14°18′40.04″E
- Country: Slovenia
- Traditional region: Upper Carniola
- Statistical region: Upper Carniola
- Municipality: Škofja Loka

Area
  - Total: 3.18 km^{2} (1.23 sq mi)
- Elevation: 340 m (1,120 ft)

Population (2002)
  - Total: 604

Puštal (pronounced [ˈpuːʃtal]; German: Burgstall) is a settlement on the right bank of the Sora River in the Municipality of Škofja Loka in the Upper Carniola region of Slovenia. It is connected to the town of Škofja Loka by a road bridge and a well-known wooden footbridge called the Devil's Footbridge (Slovene: Hudičeva brv).

== Name ==
Puštal was first attested in written sources in 1214–20 as Purchstallo and Purchstal (and as Burchstal in 1291 and 1318, Bůrchstal in 1360, and Purgstal in 1501). The original Slovene form of the name, *Purštal, was borrowed from the Middle High German name of the settlement and is derived from the Middle High German common noun burcstal 'fortified settlement'. In the past the German name was Burgstall.

== Mass grave ==
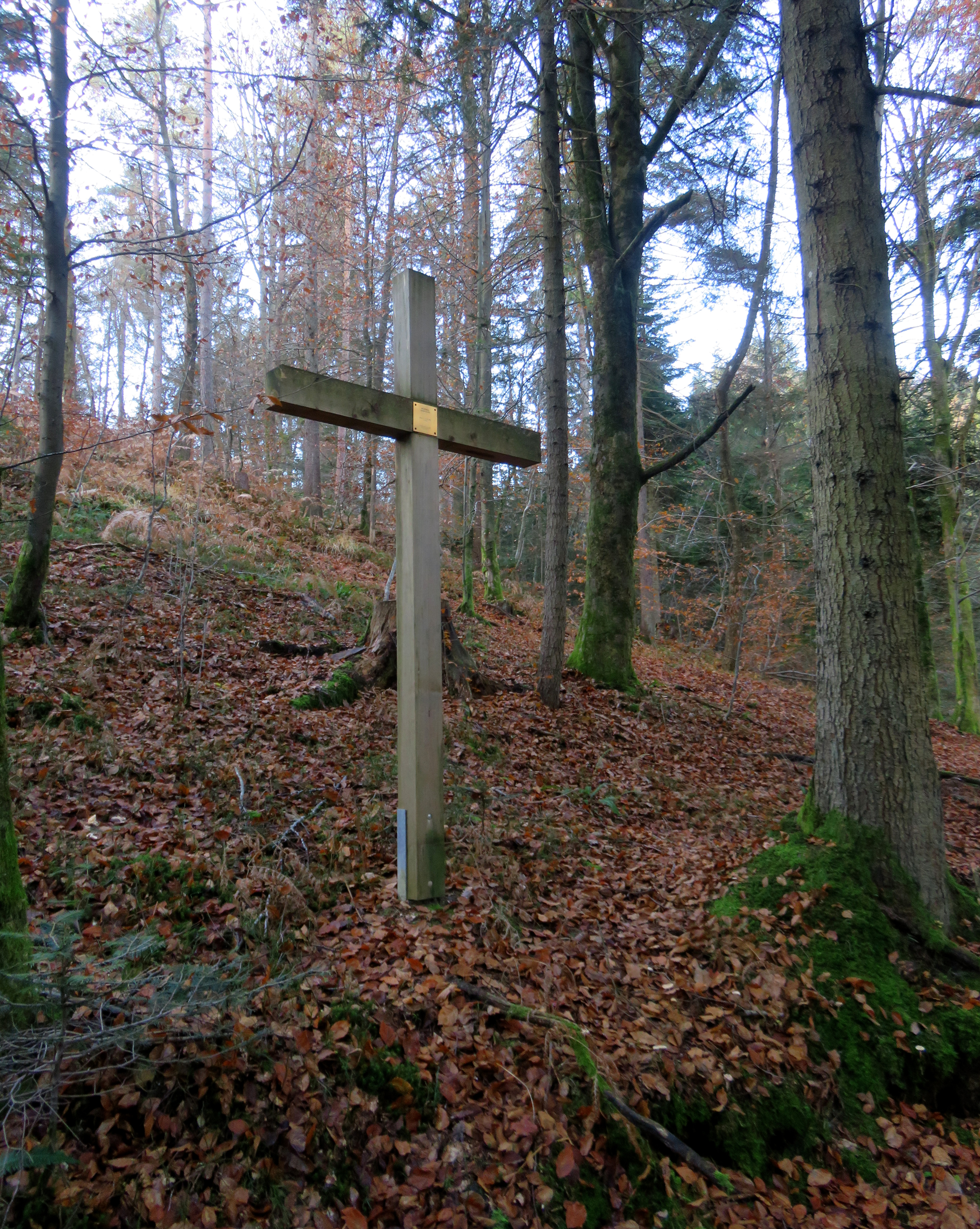
The Žovšče Mass Grave

Puštal is the site of a mass grave associated with the Second World War. The Žovšče Mass Grave (Slovene: Grobišče Žovšče), also known as the Žolšče Mass Grave (Grobišče Žolšče), is located in the Žovšče Commons, on the northeast slope of Dešna Hill, between Puštal and Bodovlje. It contains the remains of about 10 Slovene civilians that were murdered and buried at two locations about 12.5 meters (41 ft) apart.

== Church ==
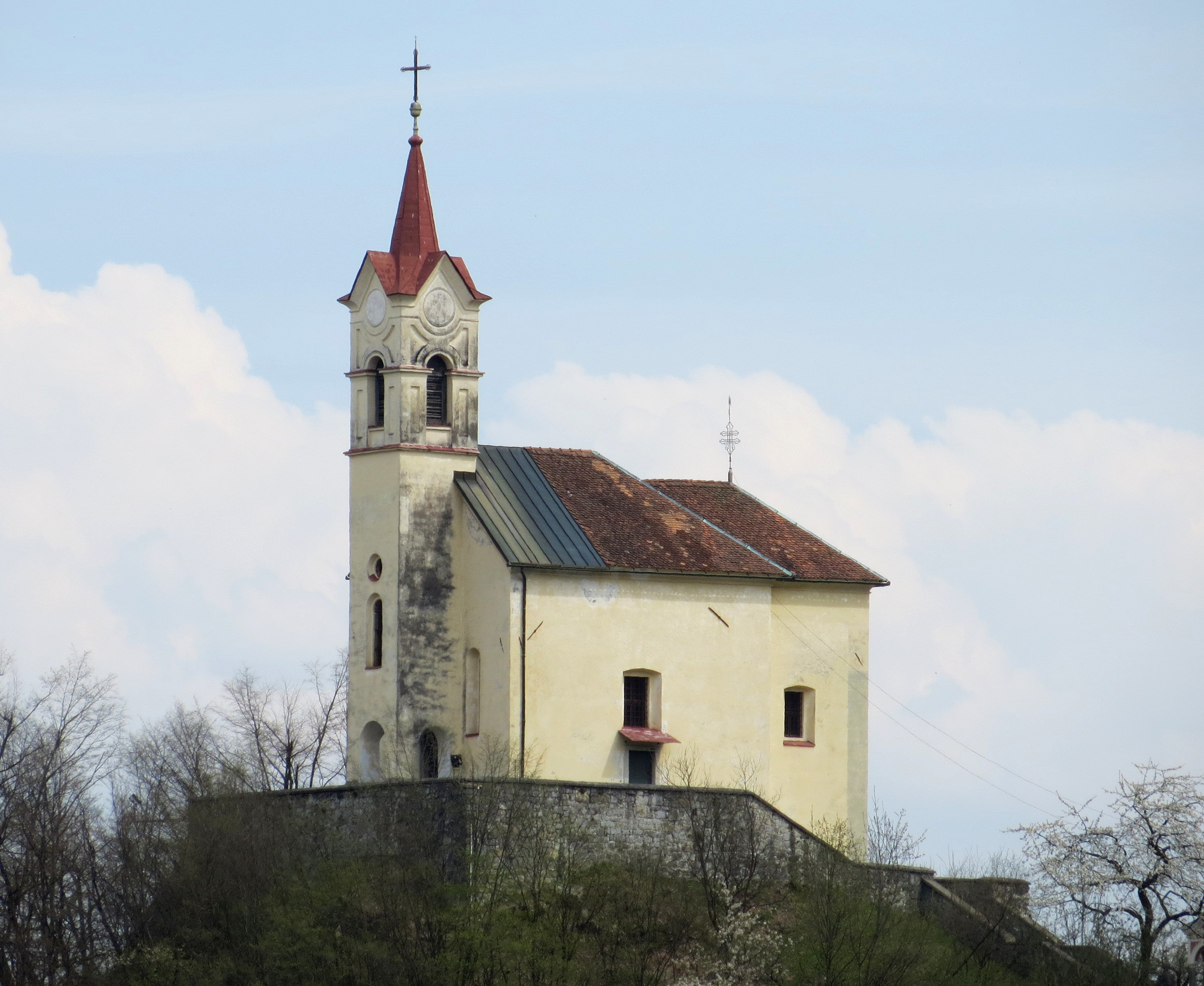
Holy Cross Church

The local church is dedicated to the Holy Cross and stands on a small hill dominating the settlement. This gives it its local name of Cerkev na Hribcu ('church on the little hill'). There are twelve small chapel-shrines representing the Stations of the Cross alongside the path up to the church.

== Cultural heritage ==
Another point of interest in Puštal is a 500-year-old wooden house known as Nace's House (Slovene: Nacetova hiša), in which a small museum collection has been assembled.

A Renaissance mansion known as Puštal Castle, now housing the Škofja Loka Music School, was originally built circa 1220 and has a rounded corner tower and an arcaded courtyard. On the wall of the castle chapel is a fresco by Giulio Quaglio the Younger, the Descent from the Cross, dating to 1706.

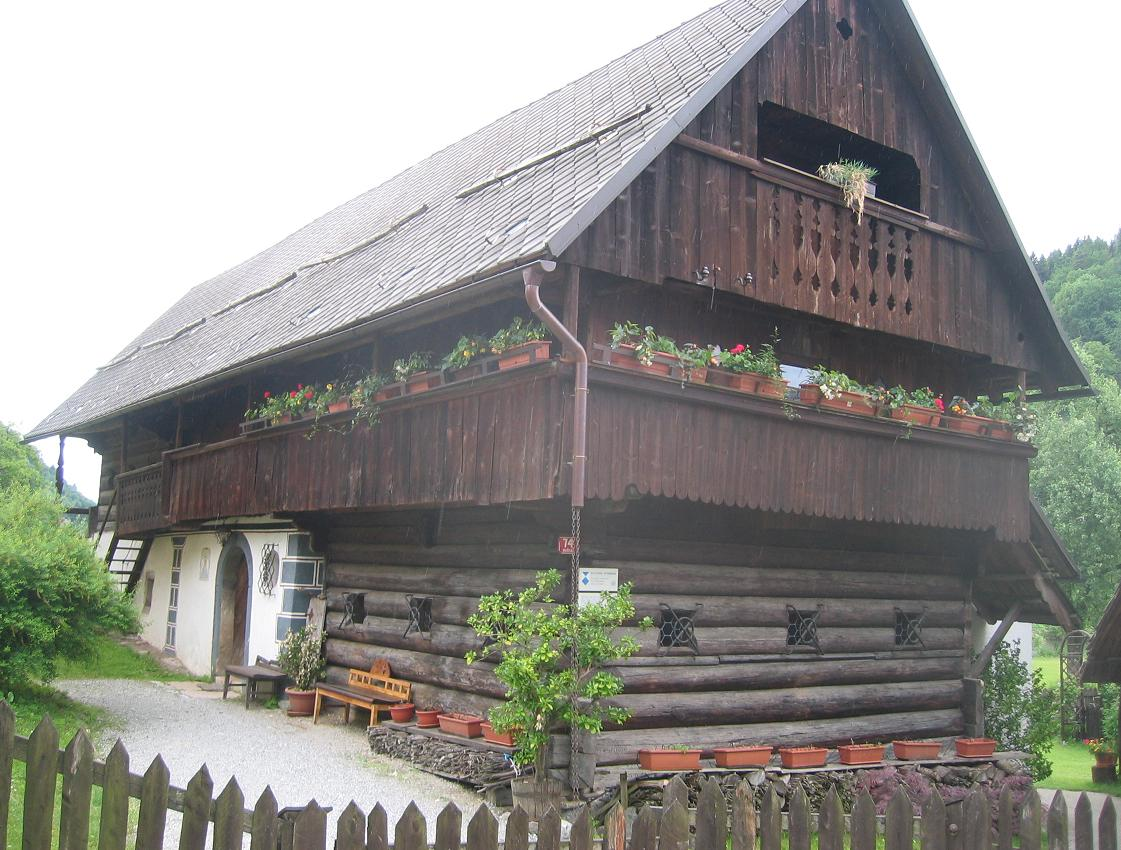
Nace's House in Puštal

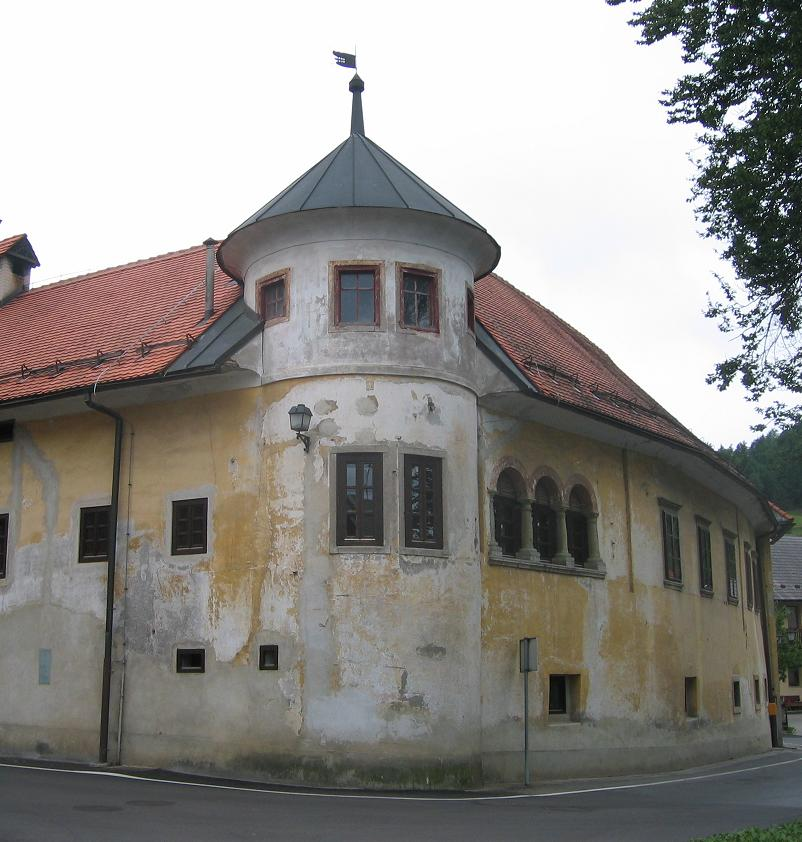
Puštal Castle

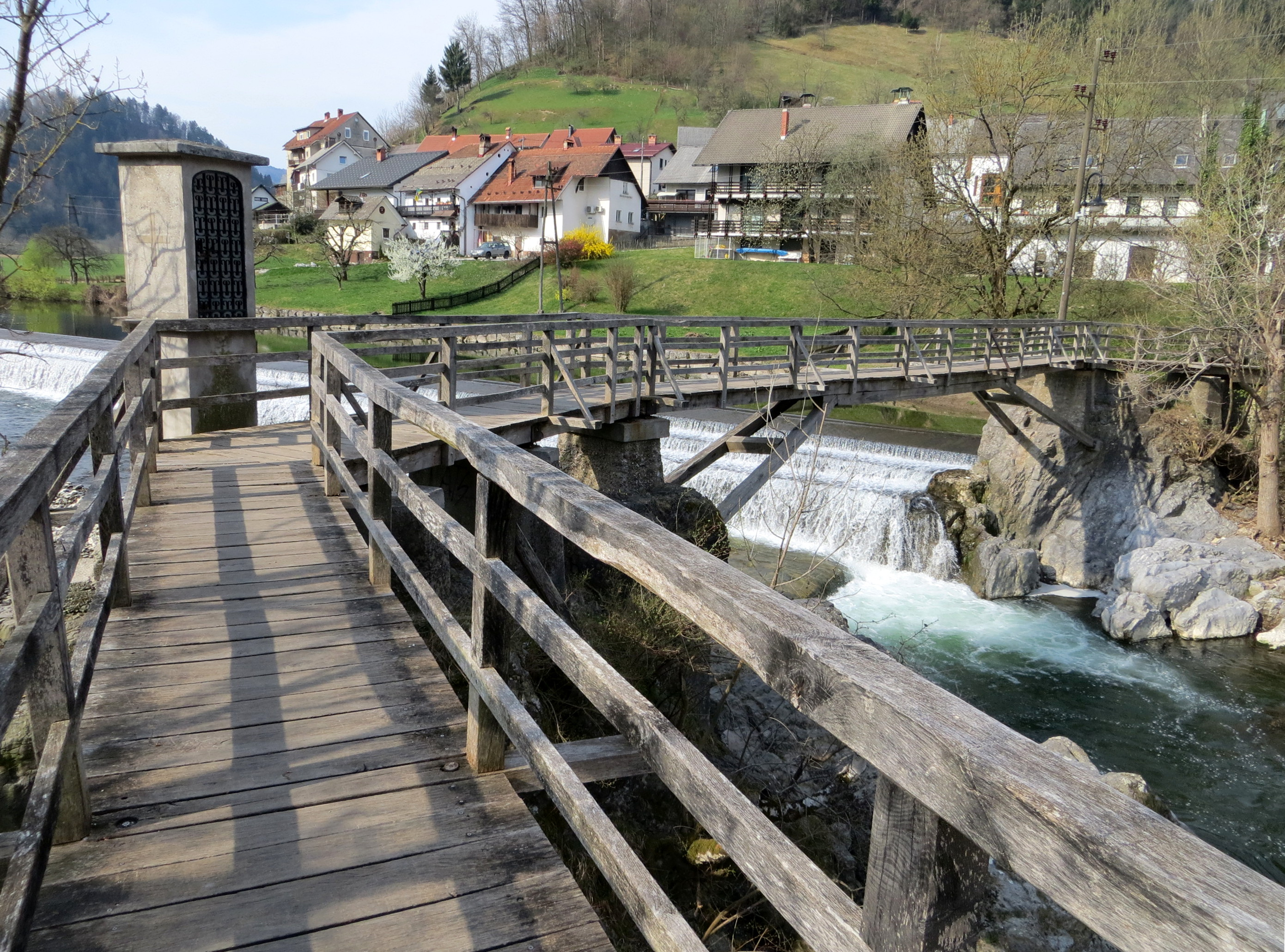
The Devil's Bridge
