= Rudi Španzel =

Slovenian painter (born 1948)

Rudi Španzel (born December 18, 1948, in Griže) is a Slovenian painter.

== Biography ==
Rudi Španzel graduated from the Academy of Fine Arts in Ljubljana. He is one of the few contemporary painters who create on the principle of Renaissance artists, who have insisted on realism and deep symbolism. He has received many domestic and foreign awards for achievements, among them the Prešeren Fund Award in 1985. He painted portraits on Slovenian tolar banknotes, in circulation from October 1991 until the introduction of euro in January 2007.
