= Ivan Grohar =

Slovene painter

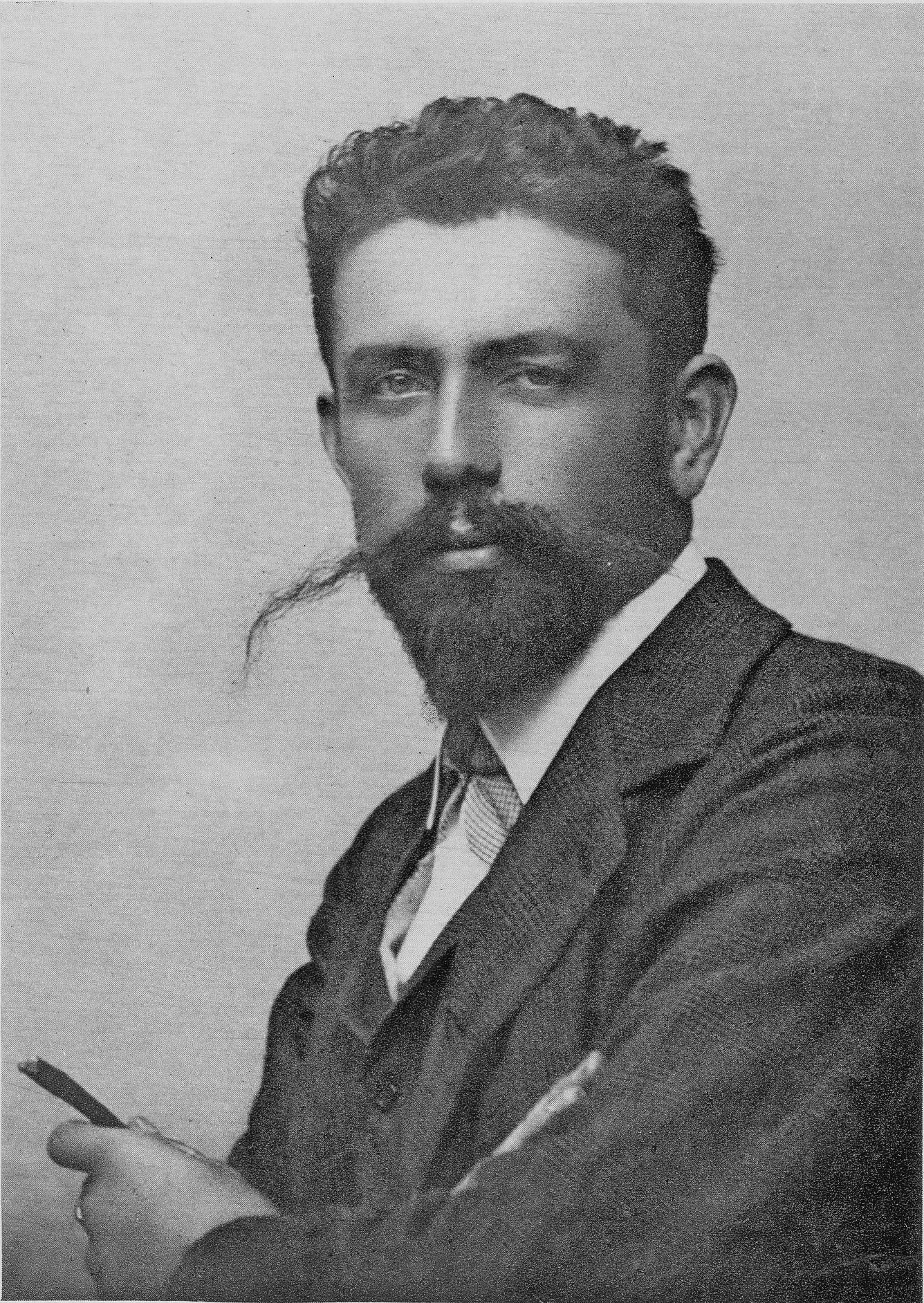
Ivan Grohar in 1911

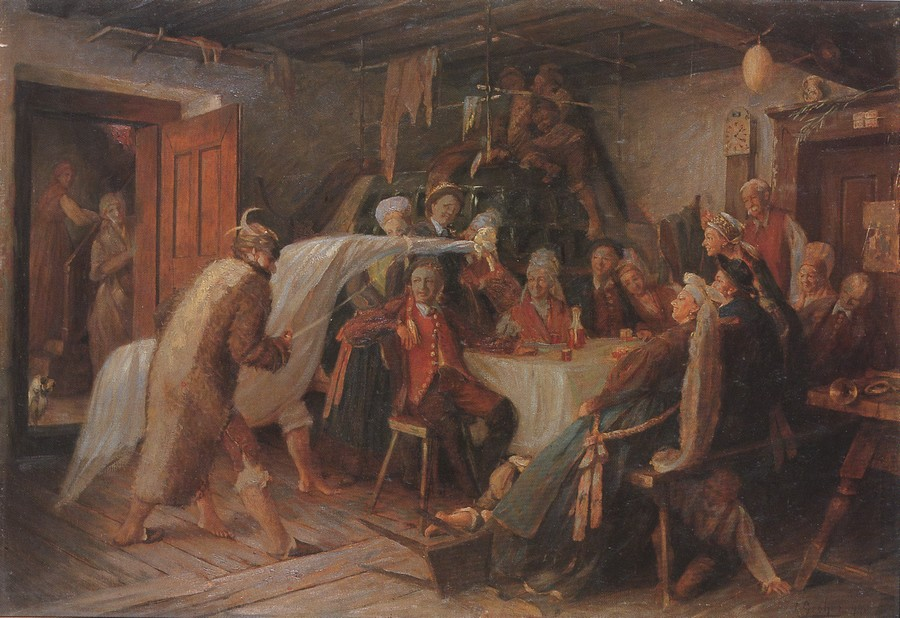
Ivan Grohar: Brna from 1899

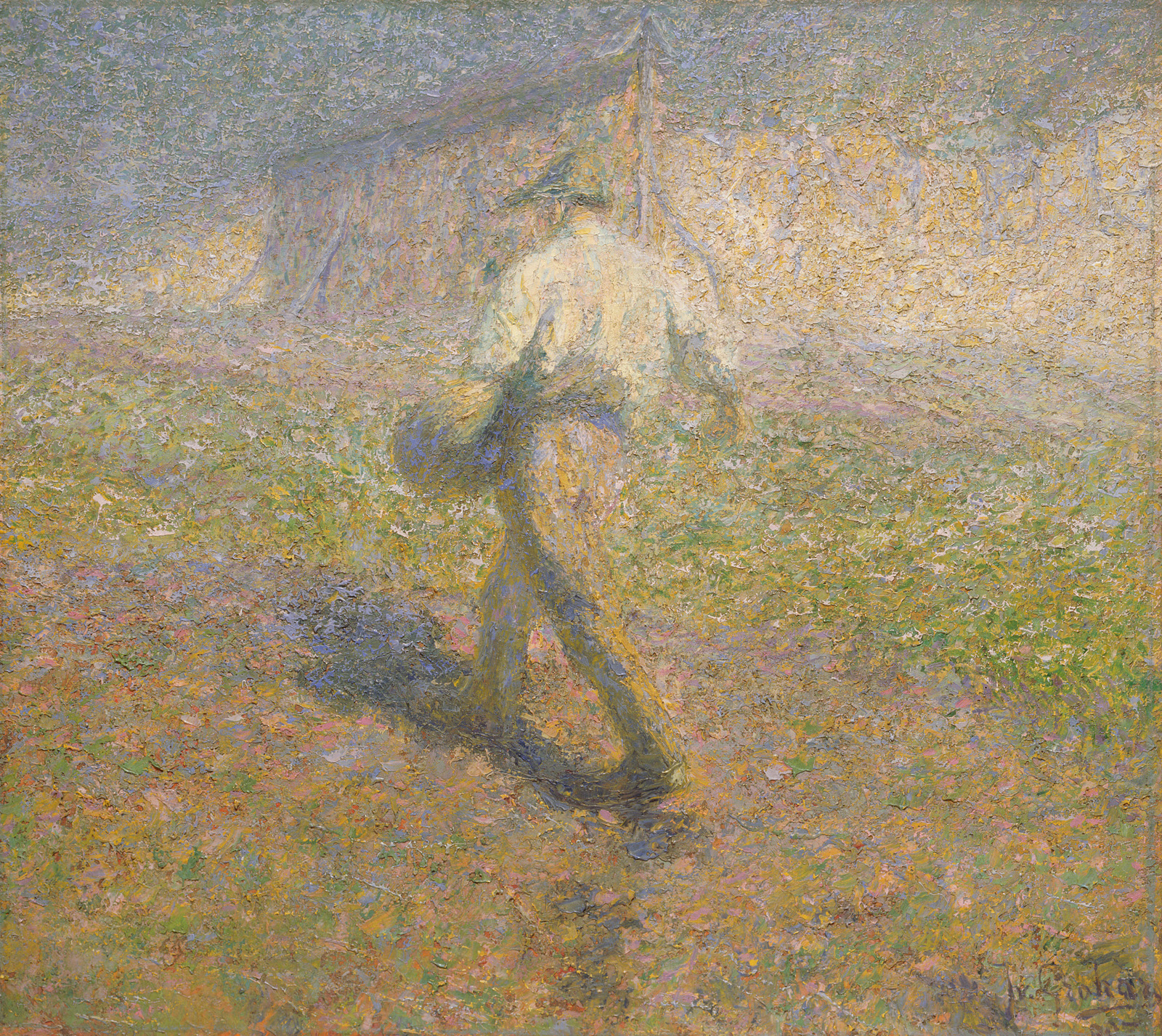
Ivan Grohar: The Sower. The motif from this 1907 painting is used on the €0.05 Slovenian euro coins

Ivan Grohar (15 June 1867 – 19 April 1911) was a Slovene Impressionist painter. Together with Rihard Jakopič, Matej Sternen, and Matija Jama, he is considered one of the leading figures of Slovene impressionism in the fin de siecle period. He is known by his landscapes and portraits. He was also an established guitarist and singer.

== Life ==
Grohar was born in the Upper Carniolan village of Spodnja Sorica, then part of Austria-Hungary. From an early age, he showed an interest in art but he could not develop his talent because he was an orphan and lived in poverty. In 1888, the local vicar Anton Jamnik sent him to an exhibition in the nearby town of Škofja Loka, enabling him to spend the summer working in the town of Kranj under the supervision of the church painter Matija Bradaška. He also travelled to Zagreb, where he worked in the atelier of Spiridion Milanesi, until he was conscripted into the Austro-Hungarian Army. He disliked the military life, so he deserted and fled to Venice, in Italy. Left with nothing, he appealed to the Austro-Hungarian consulate. In 1889 a court sentenced him to a short stay in prison and extended his military service by one year.

In 1892, he applied to the Carniolan Provincial Diet for financial assistance to study at the Graz school of painting, which he received. Two years later, he applied for assistance to study at the Academy of Fine Arts Vienna. This assistance was also approved, but despite his excellent exam result, he was not accepted to the Academy because he had not finished his studies in Graz. He continued his schooling in Graz and finished it at the end of 1894. In August 1896, he opened his own atelier in Škofja Loka. He also worked in Munich, where he attended Anton Ažbe's school of art. Back home, he befriended the impressionist painter Rihard Jakopič. In autumn of 1900, he took part in the first Slovene Artists' Exhibition, organised by the Slovene Artistic Association (Slovensko umetniško društvo, SUD). He was elected to the position of treasurer of the SUD, but illegally borrowed money from the association, for which he was sentenced to three months’ imprisonment. On his release, he left for Vienna.

In 1904, Slovene impressionists Rihard Jakopič, Matej Sternen, Matija Jama and Ivan Grohar himself, exhibited in the Mietke gallery in Vienna as the artists' club Sava. They enjoyed great success and sold several paintings. Later, Grohar exhibited in the Secession in Vienna, Belgrade, London, Kraków, Warsaw, Trieste, Duino, Berlin, and elsewhere. Despite this, he always had financial difficulties. In 1911, after interventions of the politician Janez Evangelist Krek and the painter Rihard Jakopič, the Sorica municipal council granted him 2000 crowns for a study trip to Italy. He then went to Ljubljana in order to buy everything that he would need for the trip, but he was so afflicted by illness, which he had been keeping secret, that he was delivered to the state hospital in Ljubljana, where he died of tuberculosis. He left behind a series of priceless artworks and a number of debts, which Rihard Jakopič settled for him. Jakopič was preparing his sixth artists’ exhibition in his artists’ pavilion, which was dedicated to the memory of Ivan Grohar.

Grohar began his career as a painter of religious images, but continued it as a realist. He was influenced by Giovanni Segantini. From summer 1900 onwards, he painted using symbolic elements, but later he embraced impressionism.

In 1926, a memorial exhibition was held in his honour. He had a great influence on later artists and his picture The Sower (Slovene: Sejalec) has become one of the most established and characteristic Slovene images, a symbol of the cultural transition of the Slovenes from a rural to an urban culture. This work is reproduced on the Slovenian 5-cent euro coin (2007).

His most important works were:

- Brna (1899)
- Srce Jezusovo (1900)
- Pod Koprivnikom (1902)
- Rafolško polje (1903)
- Pomlad (1903)
- Macesen (1904)
- Škofja Loka v snegu (1905)
- Sejalec (1907)
- Krompir (1909/1910)
- Mož z vozom (1910)
- Črednik (1910)

== Gallery of stolen paintings ==
Six paintings by Grohar were stolen from a museum collection at Grohar's birthplace in Spodnja Sorica in September 2007.

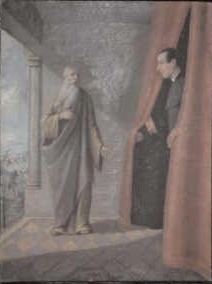
Srečanje župnika Eržena z Abrahamom, 1894

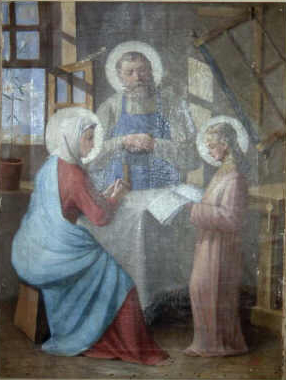
Sveta družina, 1895

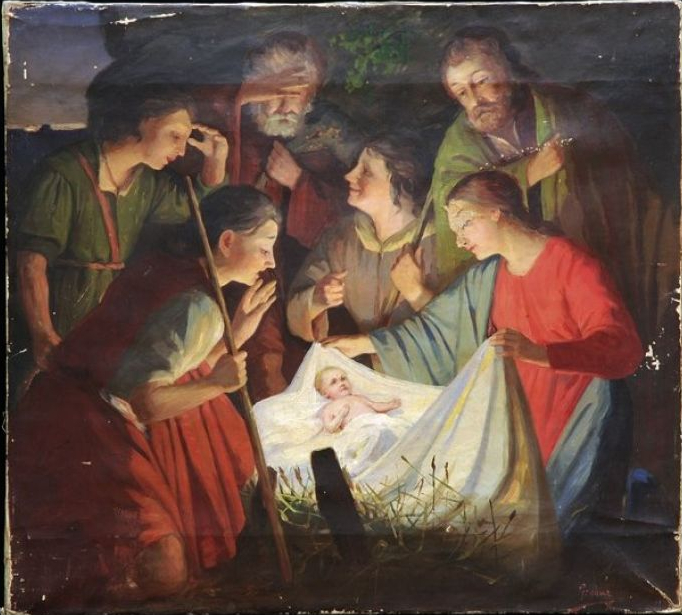
Jaslic, 1896

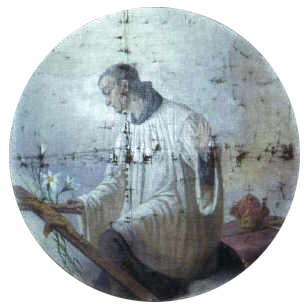
Sv. Alojzij, 1898

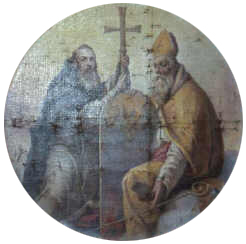
Dva svetnika, 1898

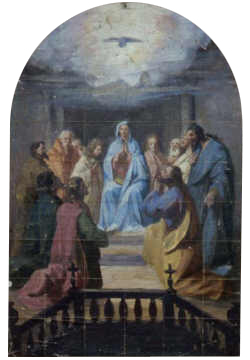
Študija za oltarno sliko, by 1911
