= Cerkev sv. Trojice =

Cerkev sv. Trojice or cerkev svete Trojice, Slovene for Holy Trinity Church, may refer to:

- Ursuline Church of the Holy Trinity, Ljubljana
- Holy Trinity Church, Hrastovlje, southwestern Slovenia
