= Luka Mislej =

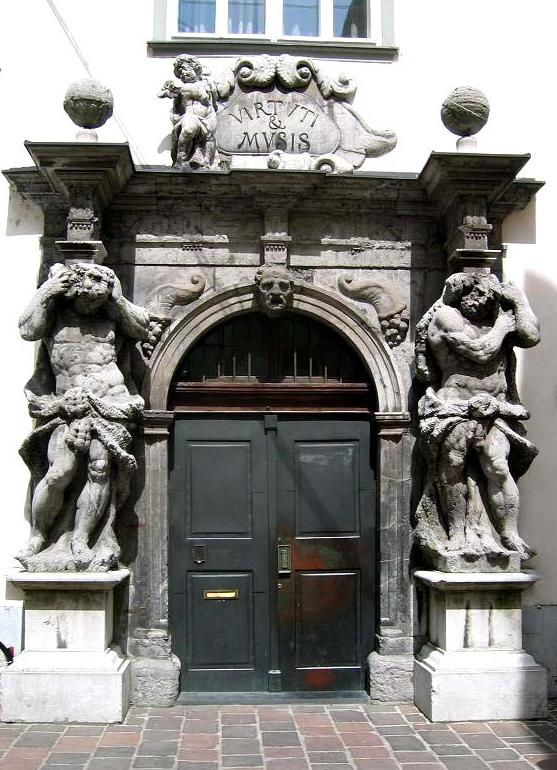
Monumental portal of Ljubljana Seminary

Luka Mislej (16 October 1670 – 5 October 1727) was a Carniolan stonemason and altar-maker.

== Life ==
Mislej, who was probably born in Vipava, lived in Ljubljana. In 1722 the Italian sculptor Francesco Robba, who took over his atelier after his death, married his daughter Theresa. Mislej died in Škofja Loka.

== Work ==
Since Mislej was the owner of a large laboratory that had numerous orders for the construction and equipping of many churches. He collaborated with several sculptors, mostly Venetian, including Angelo Di Putti, Giacomo Contieri and the already mentioned Francesco Robba.

Some of his more known works there are the monumental portal of Ljubljana Seminary (in collaboration with the sculptor Angelo Di Putti, who created the atlantes), the entrance portal and some of the side altars of St. James's Church in Ljubljana, the staircase and other parts of the interior of Ljubljana Town Hall, the Holy Trinity Column in front of the Ursuline Church of the Holy Trinity in Ljubljana (the statues were created by Robba), the altar of Brežice Castle's chapel and the main altar of St. Mary of the Assumption Church in Rijeka.
