= Ursuline Church of the Holy Trinity =

Church in Ljubljana, Slovenia

Coordinates: 46°3′0.3″N 14°30′8.39″E

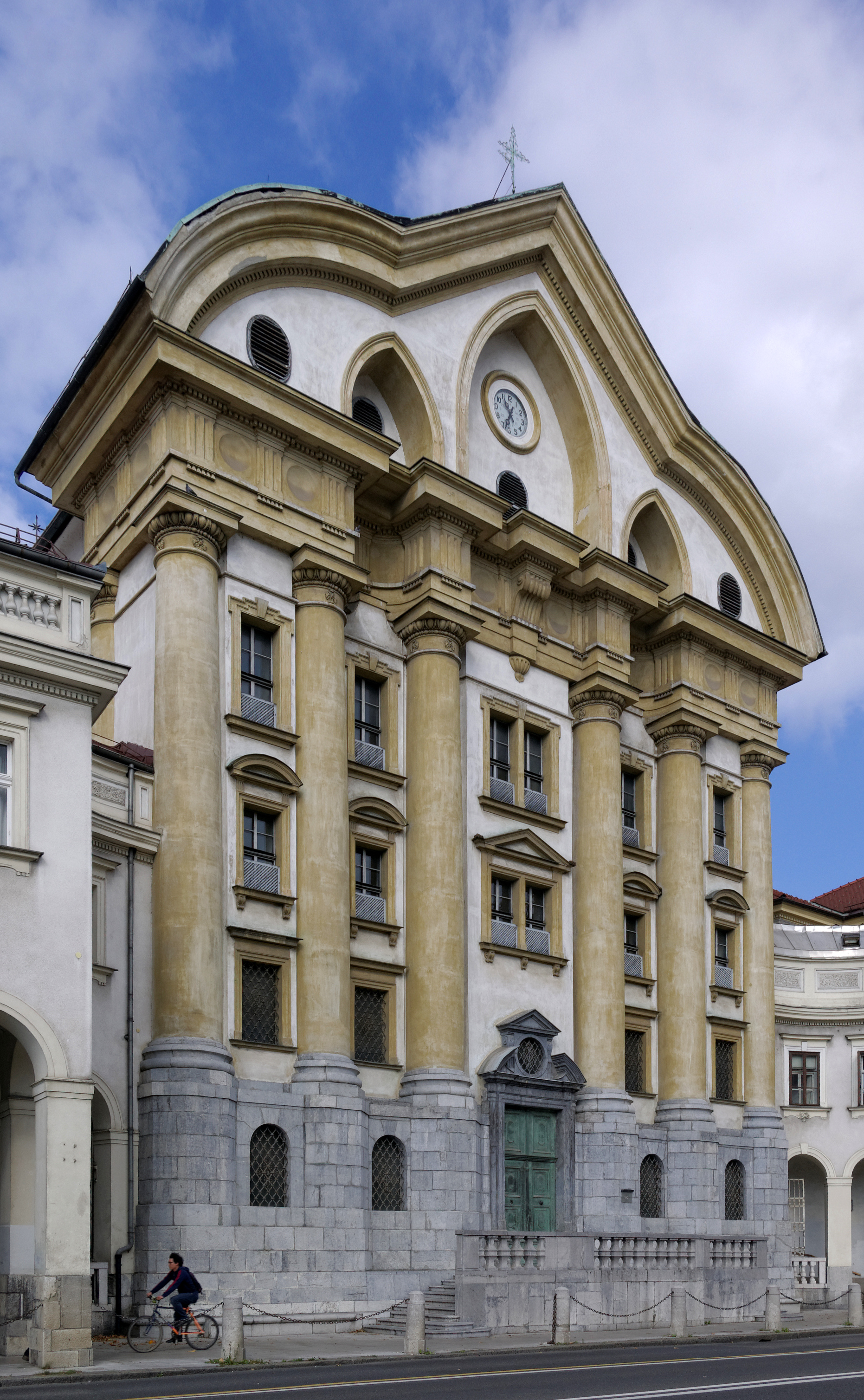
Ursuline Church along Slovene Street

Ursuline Church of the Holy Trinity (Slovene: uršulinska cerkev sv. Trojice or uršulinska cerkev Sv. Trojice), or briefly Ursuline Church (uršulinska cerkev), officially Holy Trinity Church (Cerkev svete Trojice), also Nun Church (nunska cerkev), is a parish church in Ljubljana, the capital of Slovenia. It is located at Slovene Street (Slovenska cesta), along the western border of Congress Square. It was built between 1718 and 1726 in the Baroque style. The church was designed by Carlo Martinuzzi and features an altar by Francesco Robba. After Slovenia's independence in 1991, the church was depicted on the 10 tolar banknote.

== History ==
The church was designed by Carlo Martinuzzi, a Friulian architect, and is noted for its extensive altar made of African marble designed by Francesco Robba, who also built the Fountain of the Three Rivers of Carniola which stands on Town Square in Ljubljana. The original bell tower was destroyed in the Ljubljana earthquake of 1895. The current one was built in the 1900s. The staircase in front of the entrance has been partially designed by the architect Jože Plečnik in 1930.

== Holy Trinity Column ==
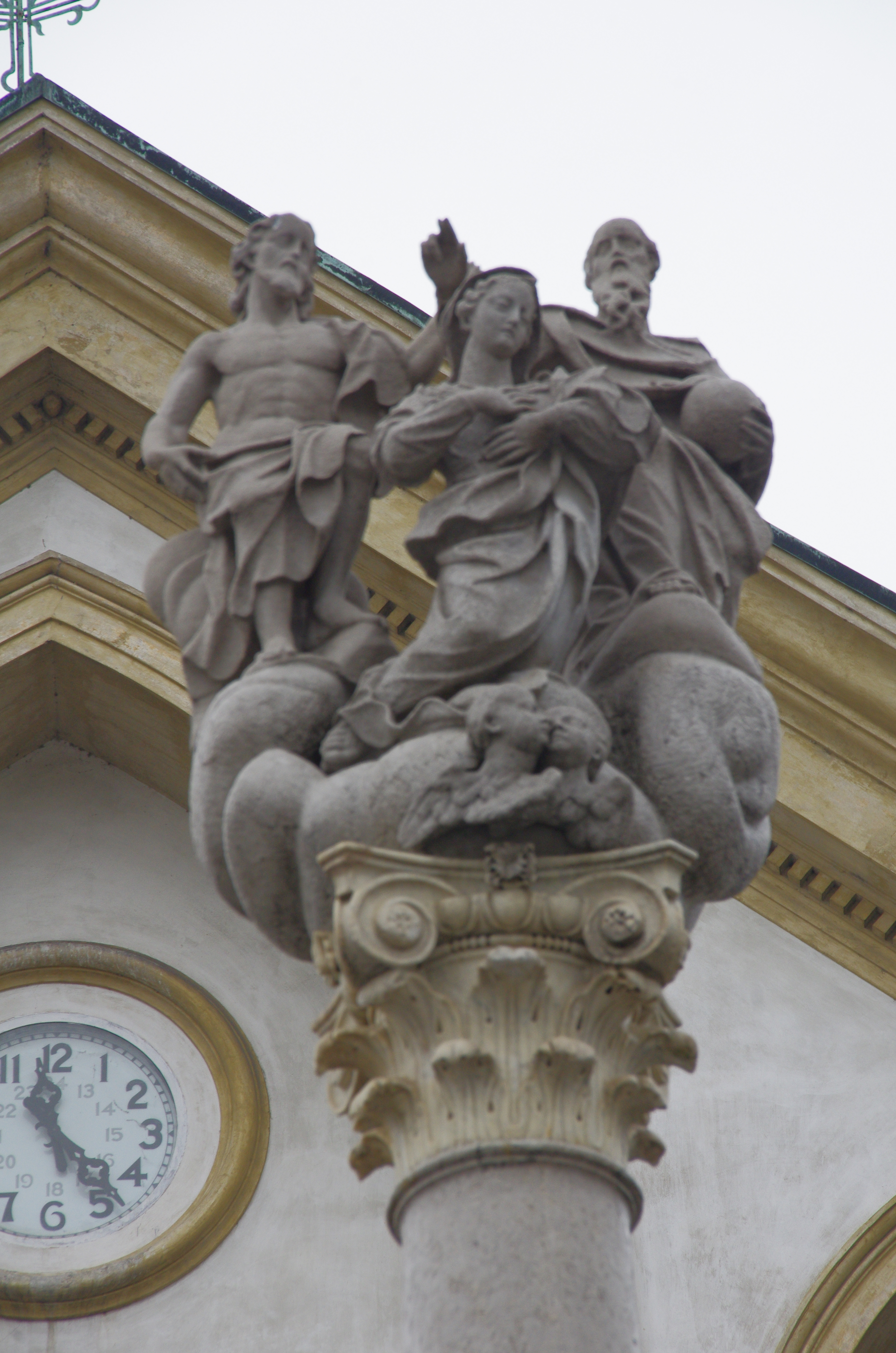
The marble statues of the Holy Trinity Column

In front of the Ursuline Church stands the Holy Trinity Column. The originally wooden column stood since 1693 in front of a Discalced Augustinian monastery at Ajdovščina. In 1722, it was replaced with a stone one, made by Luka Mislej, whereas the marble statues have been presumably created by Francesco Robba. In 1834, the stonemason Ignacij Toman made a new pedestal and the original Robba's sculpture was replaced with a replica. The original is now kept by the City Museum of Ljubljana. The column was again renovated after the 1895 Ljubljana earthquake by the stonemason Feliks Toman. It was relocated in front of the Ursuline Church in 1927 upon plans by Plečnik as part of his redesign of Congress Square. Now it forms an axis with the Ursuline Church, the lights at the square and the building of the Slovenian Philharmonics.

== Depictions ==
After in 1991 Slovenia declared independence from Yugoslavia, the Ursuline Church was portrayed on the Slovene 10 tolar banknote. It was in circulation from October 1991 until the introduction of the euro in January 2007.

== Gallery ==
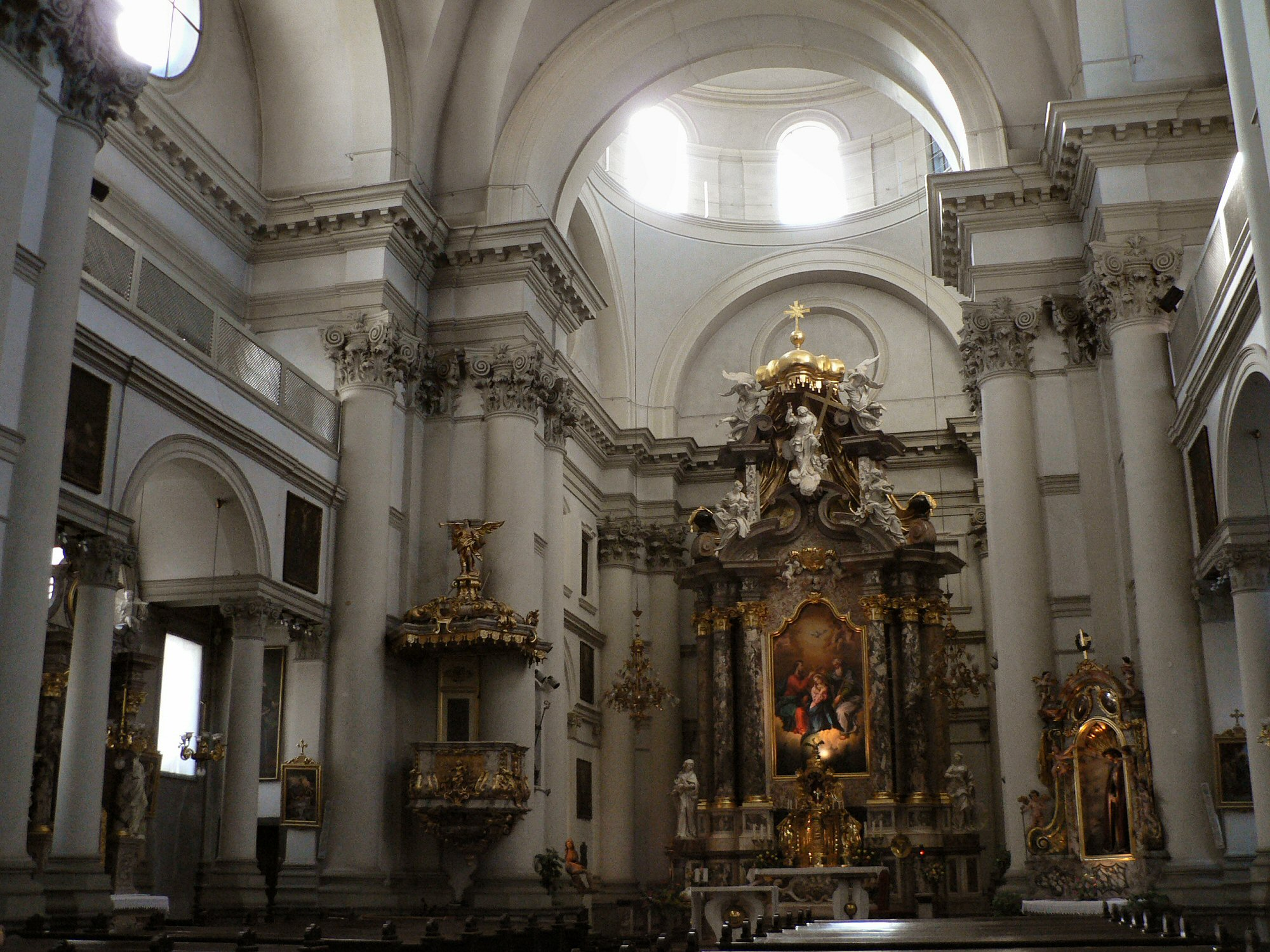
Interior

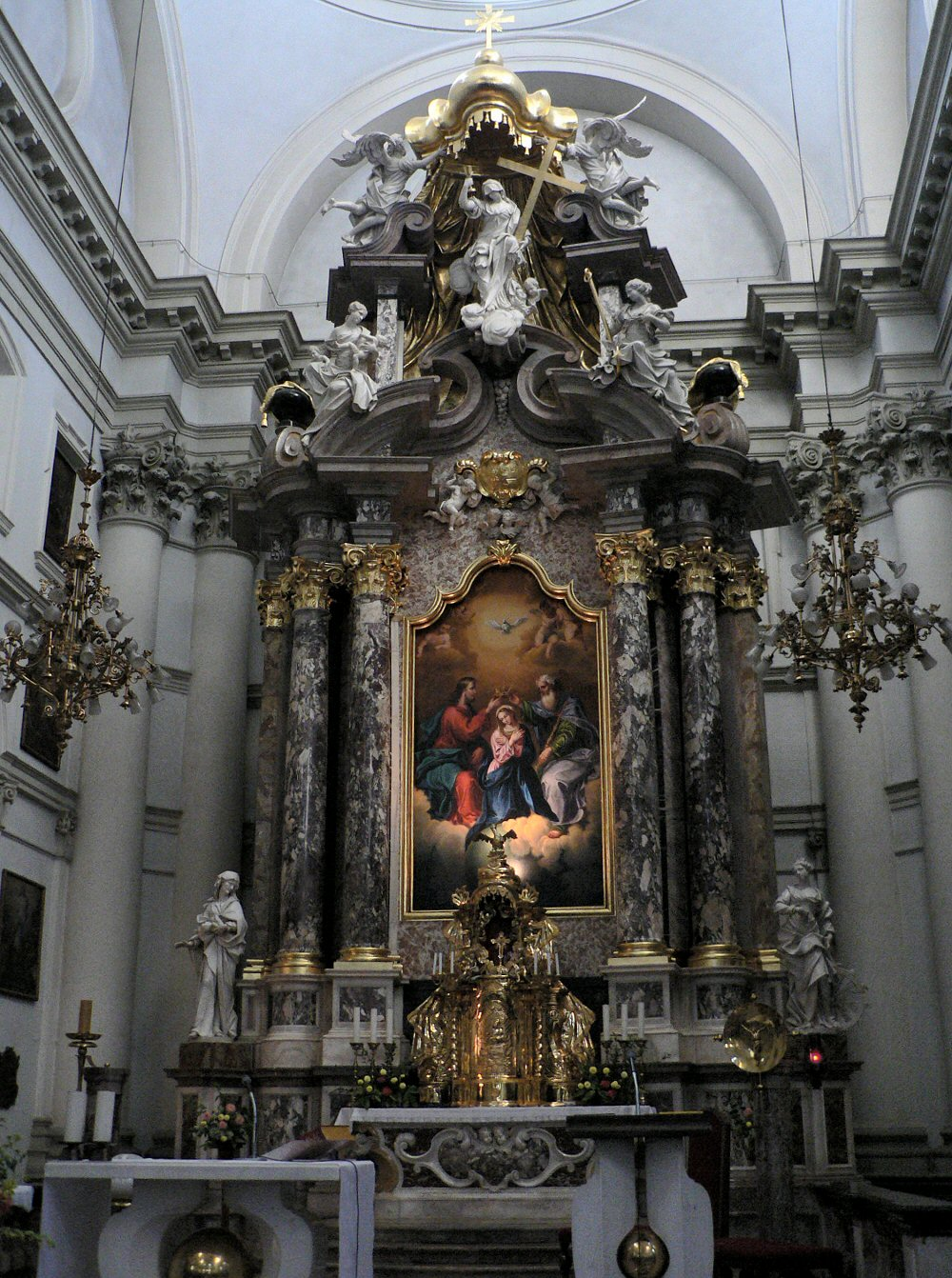
Altar

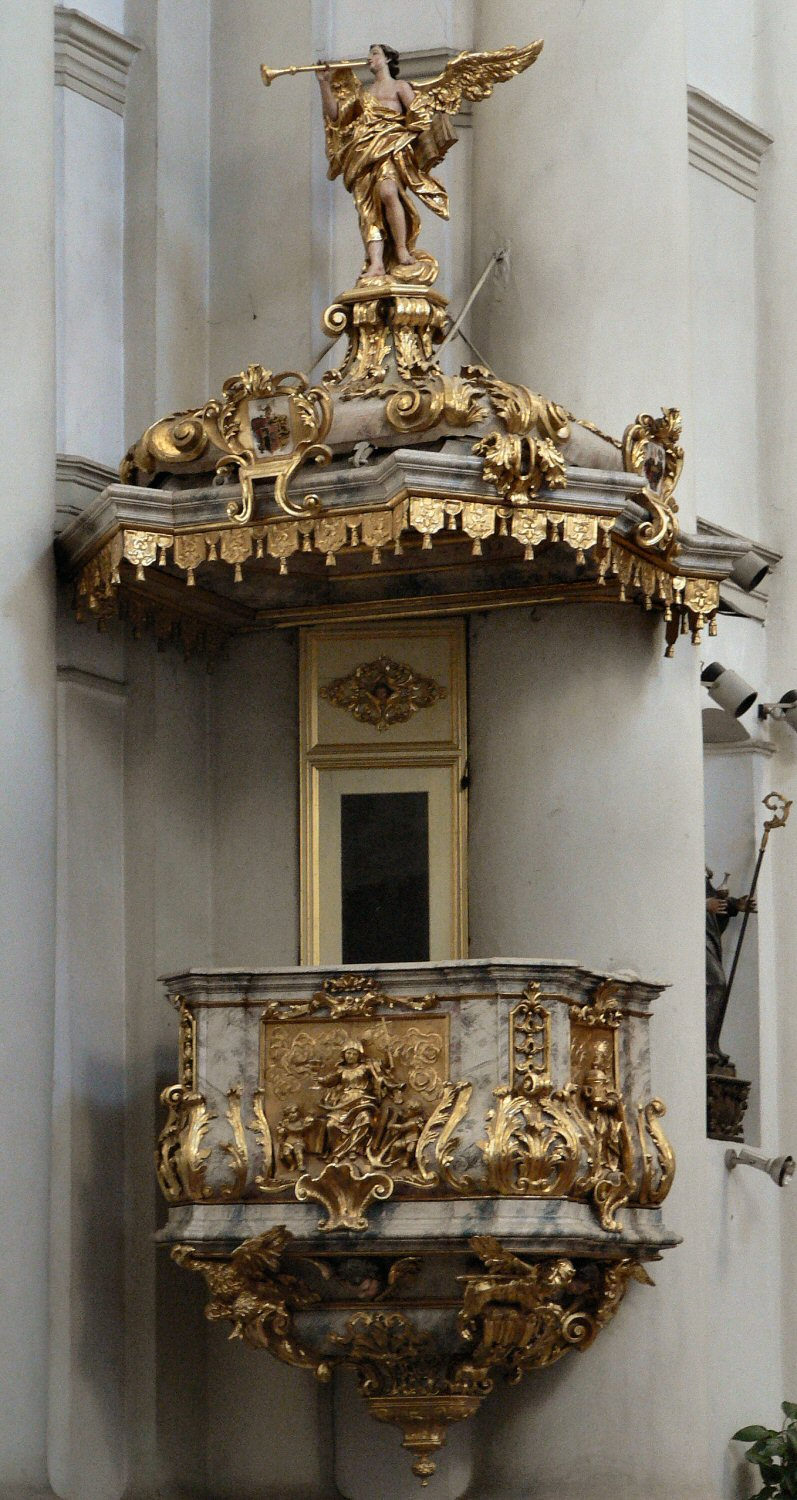
Pulpit
