= Johann Gregor Thalnitscher =

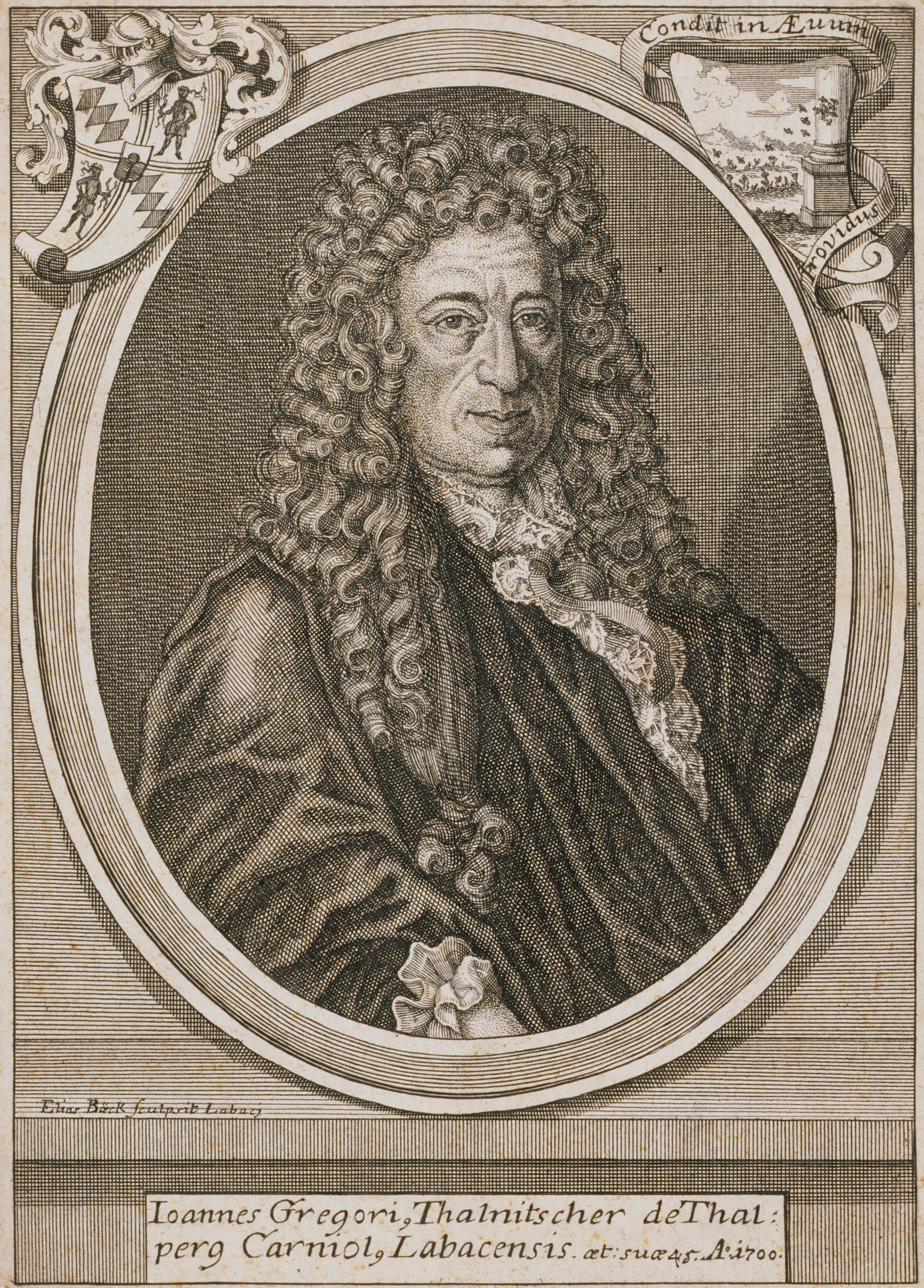
- Born: 10 March 1655; Laibach, Duchy of Carniola, Holy Roman Empire (modern-day Ljubljana, Slovenia)
- Died: 3 October 1719 (aged 64); Laibach, Duchy of Carniola, Holy Roman Empire (modern-day Ljubljana, Slovenia)
- Known for: chronicler; scholar; historian
- Parents: Maria Anna Schönleben; Johann Baptist Thalnitscher

Johann Gregor Thalnitscher von Thalberg (Slovenized: Janez Gregor Dolničar, earlier also Ivan Gregor Dolničar; 10 March 1655 – 3 October 1719) was a Carniolan lawyer, scholar of ancient inscriptions, chronicler, and historian.

== Life ==
Thalnitscher was born in Ljubljana on 10 March 1655 to Maria Anna (née Schönleben) and Johann Baptist Thalnitscher and baptized on 12 March 1655. His father was a Ljubljana judge and mayor, and made it possible for his son to study and travel throughout Germany and Italy, where he developed an enthusiasm for Baroque art. He studied in Ingolstadt and Bologna, and became a doctor of law in Bologna in 1679. After this he served as a town notary and judge in Ljubljana. Thalnitcher's father was elevated to nobility on 31 December 1688, giving the family the epithet "von Thalberg." Thalnitscher died in Ljubljana on 3 October 1719.

== Work ==
Thalnitscher was the spirit of cultural rebirth in the Baroque in Ljubljana and he also wrote about artworks and studied antiquities. His historical research is significant, and he was able to add material to his father's family chronicle. His chronicles Annales Urbis Labacensis (written in German) and Epitome chronologica (1714, in Latin) preserve many details of Carniolan history. Thalnitscher studied archaeological finds from Roman Emona and he transcribed and studied many ancient inscriptions, coins, and grave markers, including more recent ones in Ljubljana. As a member and co-founder of the Academia Operosorum Labacensium, he helped publish materials about Carniolan history that were then distributed to various academies abroad. His extensive library, now part of Ljubljana's Seminary Library (Slovene: Semeniška knjižnica), contains many pamphlets and ephemera that are a valuable source on musical and theater life in Baroque Ljubljana.

Thalnitscher acted as a promoter and adviser for artistic projects in Ljubljana, and it is to his credit that the Italian late Baroque is also reflected throughout the wider Carniolan countryside. He succeeded in engaging prominent foreign artists in the construction of the Ljubljana Cathedral. He also proposed founding an "Academy of the Three Arts" (Academia trium atrium) devoted to painting, sculpture, and architecture, but this was never realized.

Thalnitscher's inventory of the old and new Ljubljana Cathedral, titled Cathedralis Basilicae Labacensis Historia (1701–1719), was published in 1882 as Historia Cathedralis Ecclesiae Labacensis and is the first theoretical treatise on its artworks.
