= Pietro Baratta =

Italian sculptor (1659–1729)

Pietro Baratta (1659–1729) was an Italian sculptor of the Baroque period, active in Venice.

He was master of the sculptor Francesco Robba.

== Biography ==
Born in Carrara, Tuscany, he worked in Venice and Udine, at the villas on the mainland and as a landscape architect.

He was the nephew of the sculptor Francesco Baratta the elder (1590–1666), who had worked in Rome in the studio of Bernini. Even his two brothers, Francesco and Giovanni, were sculptors.

He had his own studio in which many trainees, including the sculptor Francesco Robba, apprenticed. He also had many orders from abroad: for the baroque gardens of St. Petersburg Pietro Baratta and his workshop executed a series of allegorical sculptures, many of which have been preserved, including a sculpture of "Andromeda", an "Allegory of Architecture" and busts including the "Allegory of Winter", the "Allegory of Spring" and others.

== Works ==
He is responsible for the sculptures in the facade of the Villa Manin's Chapel at Passariano di Codroipo (Udine); these include the statues of the four Evangelists and of the Madonna with the Child.

Pietro Baratta is also the probable author of five statues of St Roch, St Antony Abbot, the Blessed Virgin of the Rosary, St Matthew and St John Baptist on the facade of the Church of Santa Maria at Villa Vicentina (VI), built between 1660 and 1680 on the site of an older building.

Pietro Baratta is the author of the statue of St Ignatius of Loyola, shown in a contemplative attitude, with an open Bible in his hands, for the church of Santa Maria Assunta (I Gesuiti) in Venice.

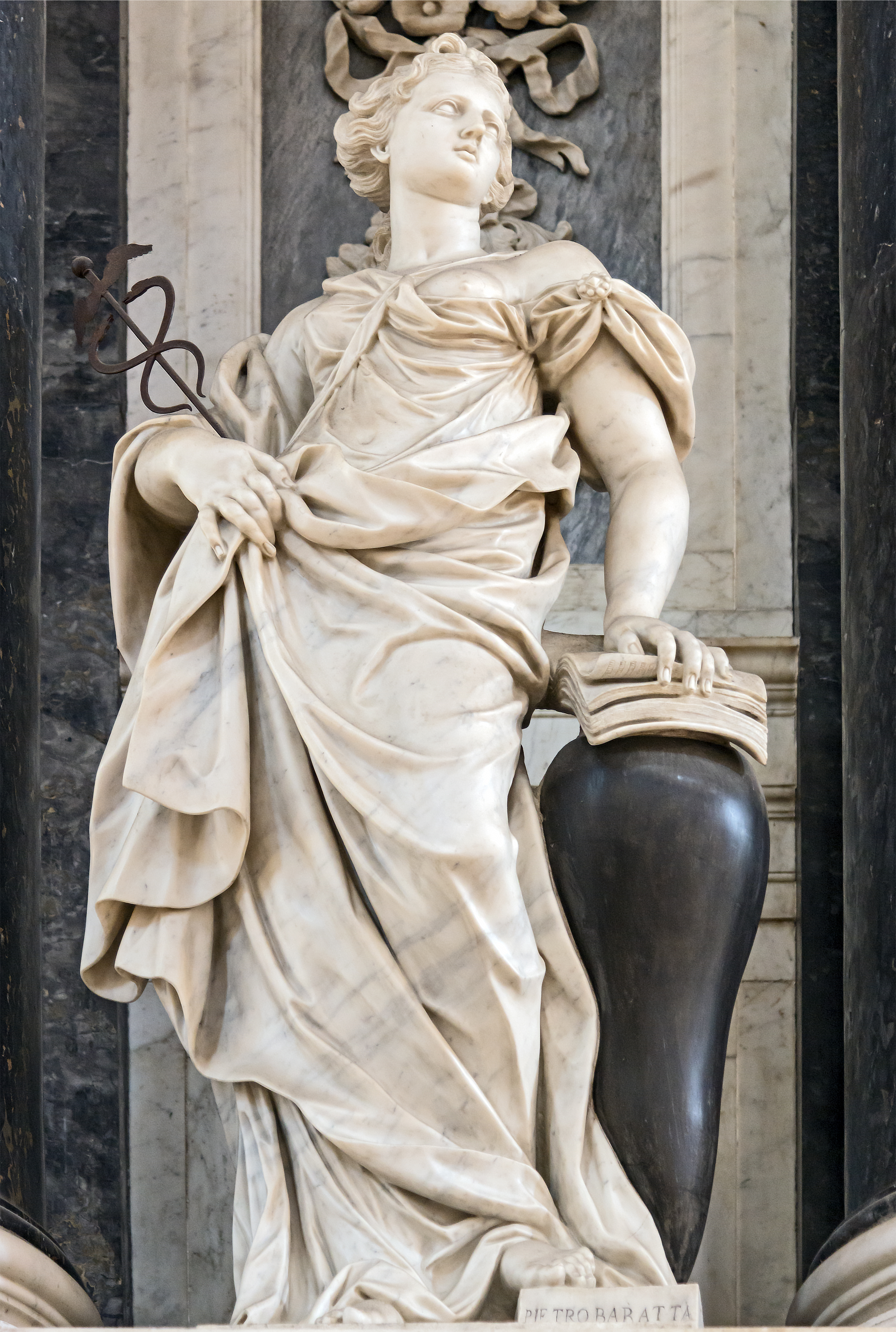
The Wisdom San Zanipolo Venice

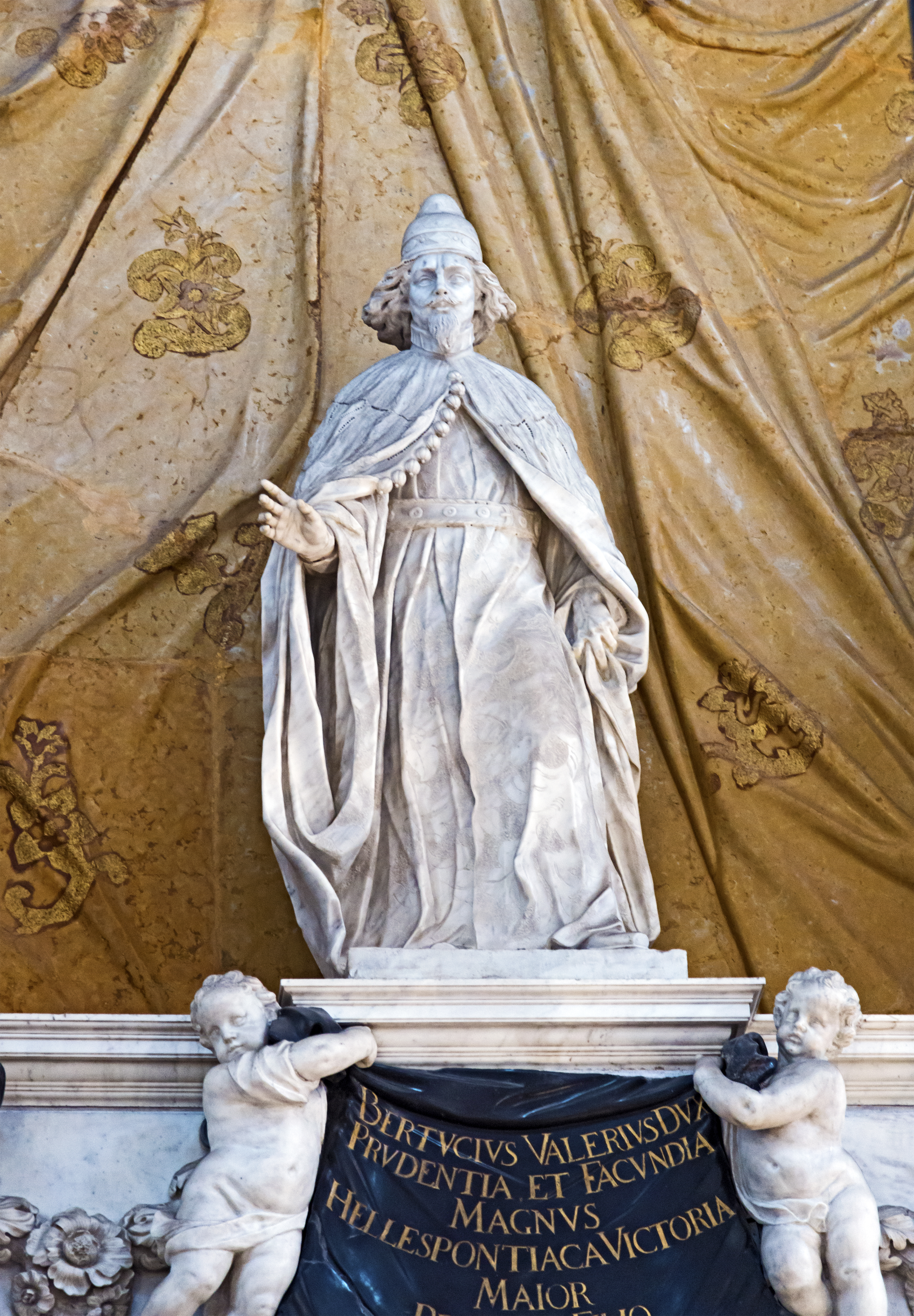
Bertuccio Valier San Zanipolo Venice

== Bibliography ==
- Ticozzi, Stefano (1830). Dizionario degli architetti, scultori, pittori, intagliatori in rame ed in pietra, coniatori di medaglie, musaicisti, niellatori, intarsiatori d'ogni etá e d'ogni nazione' (Volume 1). Milan: Gaetano Schiepatti. p. 106.
