= St. James's Parish Church (Ljubljana) =

Church in Ljubljana, Slovenia

Coordinates: 46°2′46.25″N 14°30′26.38″E

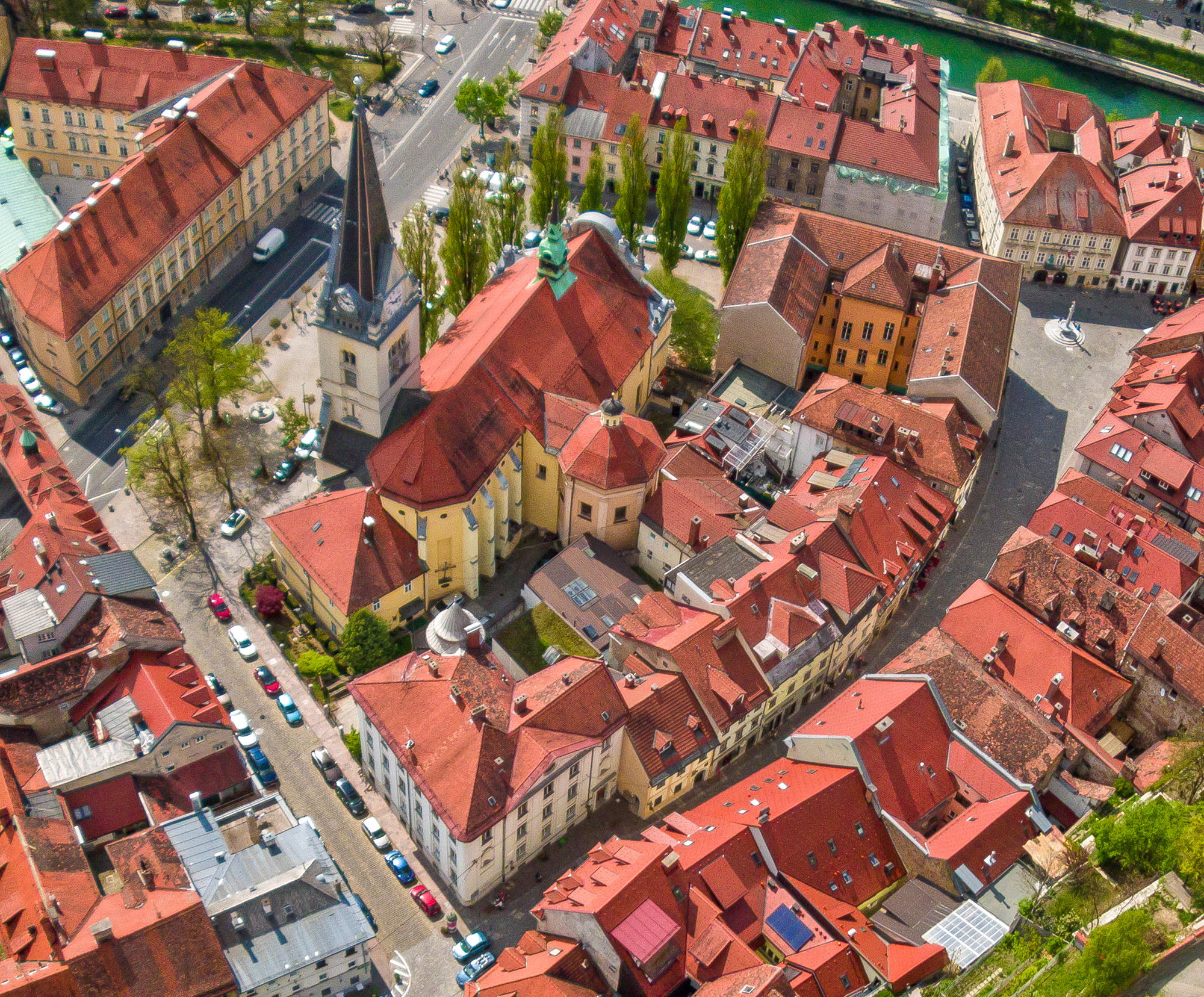
St. James Church in the wider context of Ljubljana Old Town

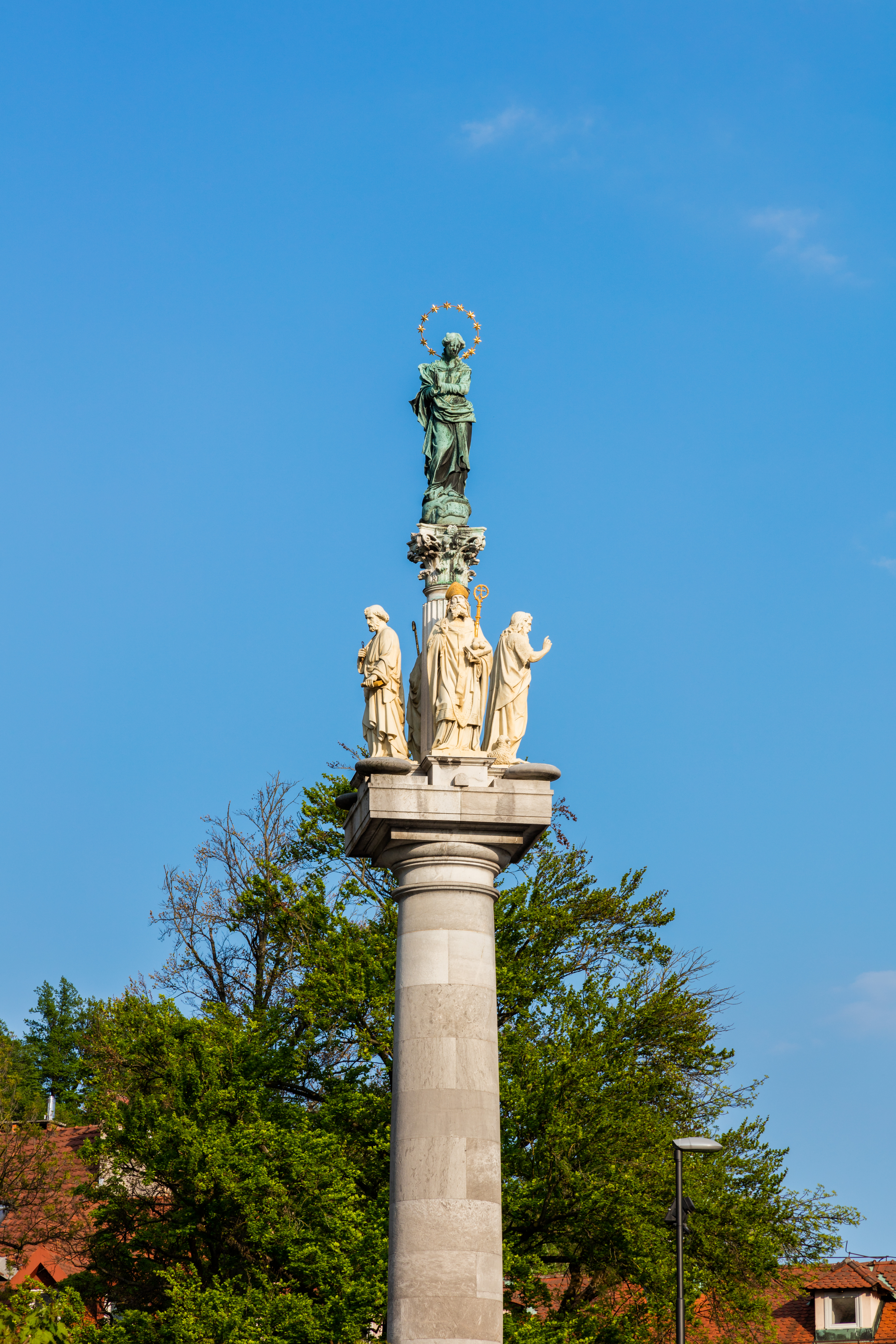
Detail of the column.

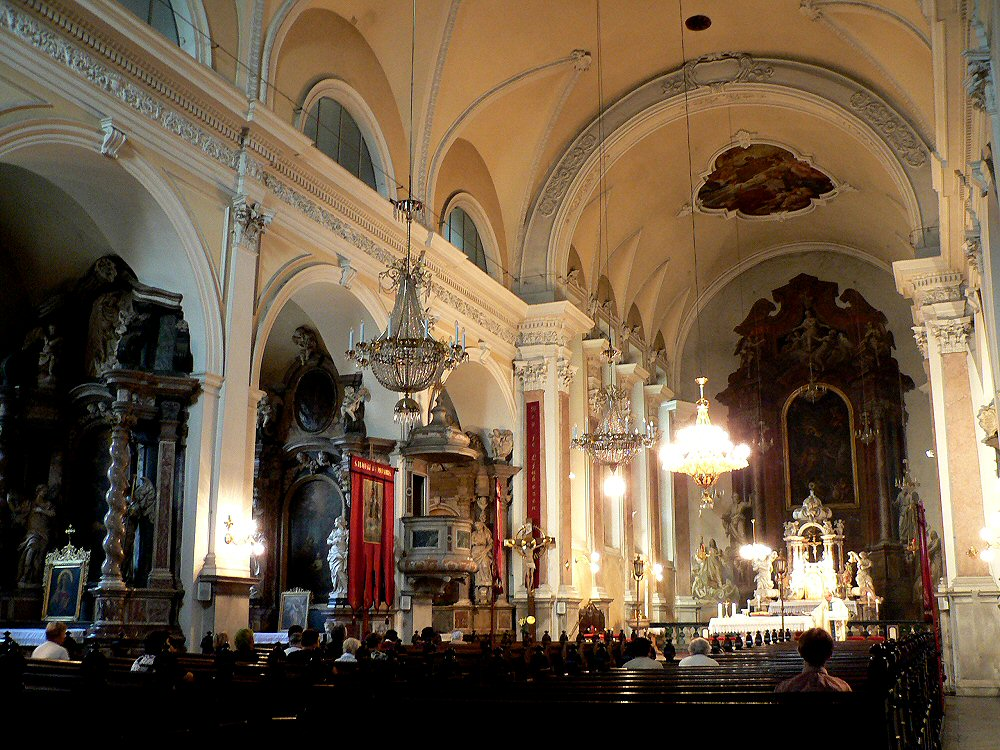
Interior of St. James's Parish Church

St. James's Parish Church (Slovene: župnijska cerkev sv. Jakoba, šentjakobska cerkev) is a church in Ljubljana, the capital of Slovenia. It is dedicated to St. James the Greater. Its name is often incorrectly translated as St. Jacob's because Slovene, like many other languages, uses the same word for both James and Jacob.

In the late 1920s, the square in front of the church was renovated by the Slovene architect Jože Plečnik, and in the early 1950s by the architect Boris Kobe. Opposite St. James's Church is Gruber Mansion, which houses the Slovenian National Archives.

== History ==
The church was built in the Baroque style between 1613 and 1615 on the site of an older Gothic style church, erected in the early 15th century by the Augustinian Order. In 1598, the old church was acquired by the Jesuits and thus became the first Jesuit church in the Slovene Lands and one of the first in the Inner Austria. The interior was designed by the Italian architect Francesco Robba, who designed the main altar, and the Slovene stonemason Luka Mislej, who designed the entrance portal and the stone side altars. After the Ljubljana earthquake of 1895, the church was renovated by the Linz-based architect Raimund Jeblinger and the interiors were redesigned by Janez Šubic. Nevertheless, much of the original Baroque style has remained intact.

== St. Mary's Column ==
On the side of the church there is a column erected in 1682 to commemorate the Habsburg victory against the Ottoman Turks in the Battle of Saint Gotthard.

The originally marble column, dedicated to the Virgin Mary, was designed by Johann Weikhard von Valvasor, featuring the brass statue of the Virgin cast by the town bell-maker Christoph Schlag upon the model of the Salzburg-based artist Wolf Weisskirchner, and the stone statues of Saint Joseph, Saint Leopold, Saint Ignatius of Loyola, and Saint Francis Xavier. The used thin-wall brass sculpture casting technique, invented by Valvasor, was published in the Philosophical Transactions of the Royal Society (London, 1687), and is considered the first internationally recognised Carniolan invention.

The stone statues were in 1870 replaced with spelter statues, and marble (except for the top part with the capital) replaced with limestone. In 1938, the monument was redesigned upon plans by the architect Jože Plečnik, with a new pedestal and limestone column, whereas the marble part, the four pewter statues, and the statue of the Virgin were retained.

== See also ==
- List of Jesuit sites
