= Francesco Robba =

Venetian sculptor

- Born: 1 May 1698; Venice, Republic of Venice
- Died: 24 January 1757 (aged 58); Zagreb, Kingdom of Hungary
- Occupation: Sculptor
- Years active: 1720–1757
- Spouse: Theresa Mislej

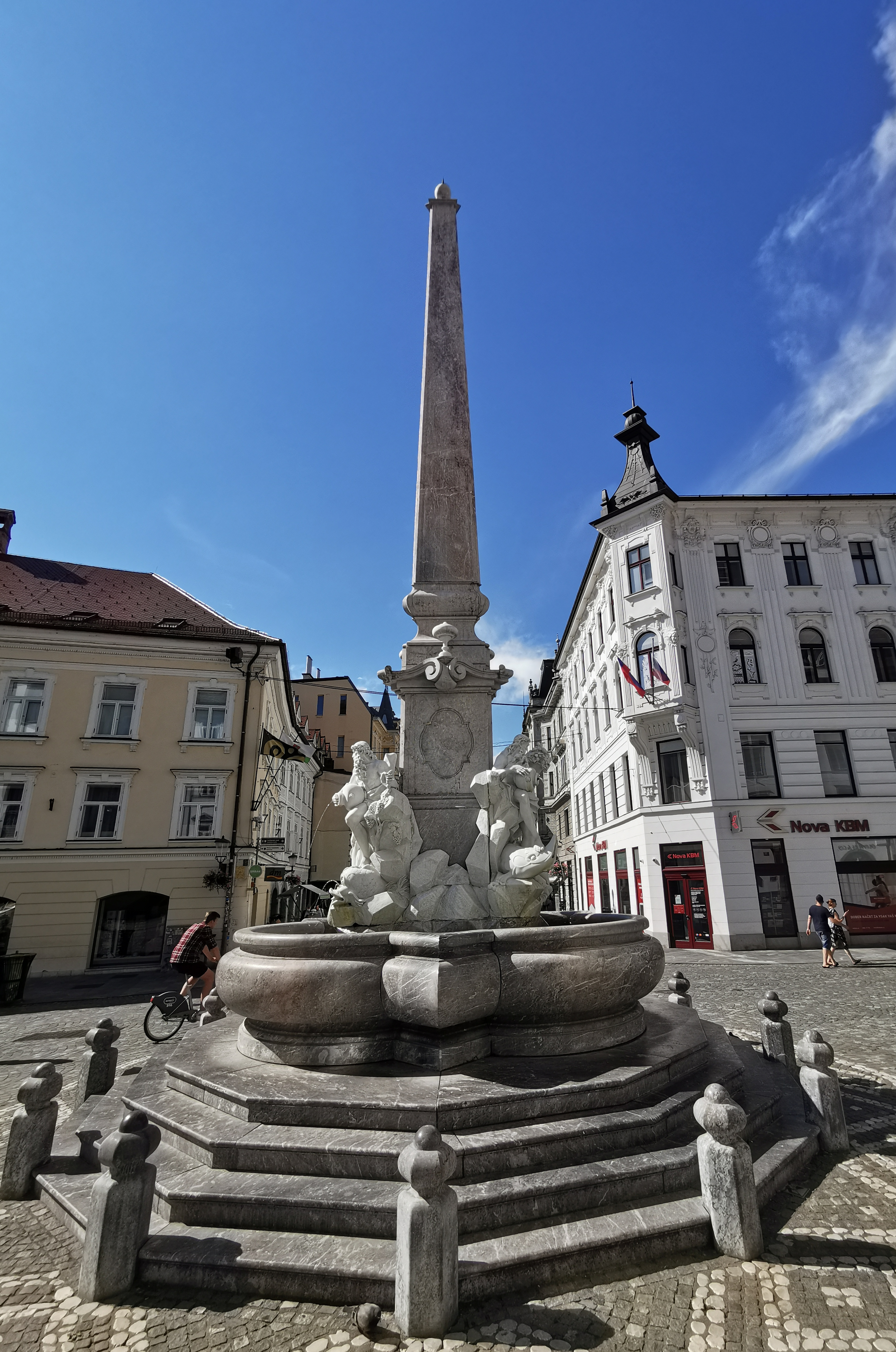
The Robba Fountain at Town Square in Ljubljana

Francesco Robba (1 May 1698 – 24 January 1757) was an Italian sculptor of the Baroque period from Venice.

== Life ==
Francesco Robba was born in Venice. He received his training in the workshop of the Venetian sculptor Pietro Baratta from 1711 to 1716. In 1720, he moved to Ljubljana (then in the Duchy of Carniola in the Holy Roman Empire) to work for the Jesuit order. There he married Theresa Mislej, the daughter of the local stonemason Luka Mislej, on 16 April 1722.

In this early period, his first marble statues and reliefs still reflect the influence of Pietro Baratta. When Mislej died in 1727, Robba took over his workshop and his clientele. Soon Robba started to earn his own reputation and was awarded commissions by ecclesiastical, aristocratic and bourgeois patrons. Already in 1729 his work was praised in a letter to Prince Emmerich Esterházy, Archbishop of Esztergom by the rector of the Jesuit College in Zagreb, Francesco Saverio Barci.

From 1727 on his works attest of a growing self-confidence. His technical virtuosity manifests itself in the emotional expressions and the refined forms of his statues. During his stay in Ljubljana, he didn't lose contacts with Venice, since he paid several visits to his native city. This allowed him to remain familiar with the Baroque sculpture of Venice, central Italy and Rome.

The prevailing view has been that in 1755, Robba left Ljubljana for Zagreb, Croatia, where he died two years later on 24 January 1757. According to an article published in 2001 by Blaž Resman, new documents had shown that even though Robba died on a short trip to Zagreb, his residence and his workshop remained in Ljubljana.

== Works ==
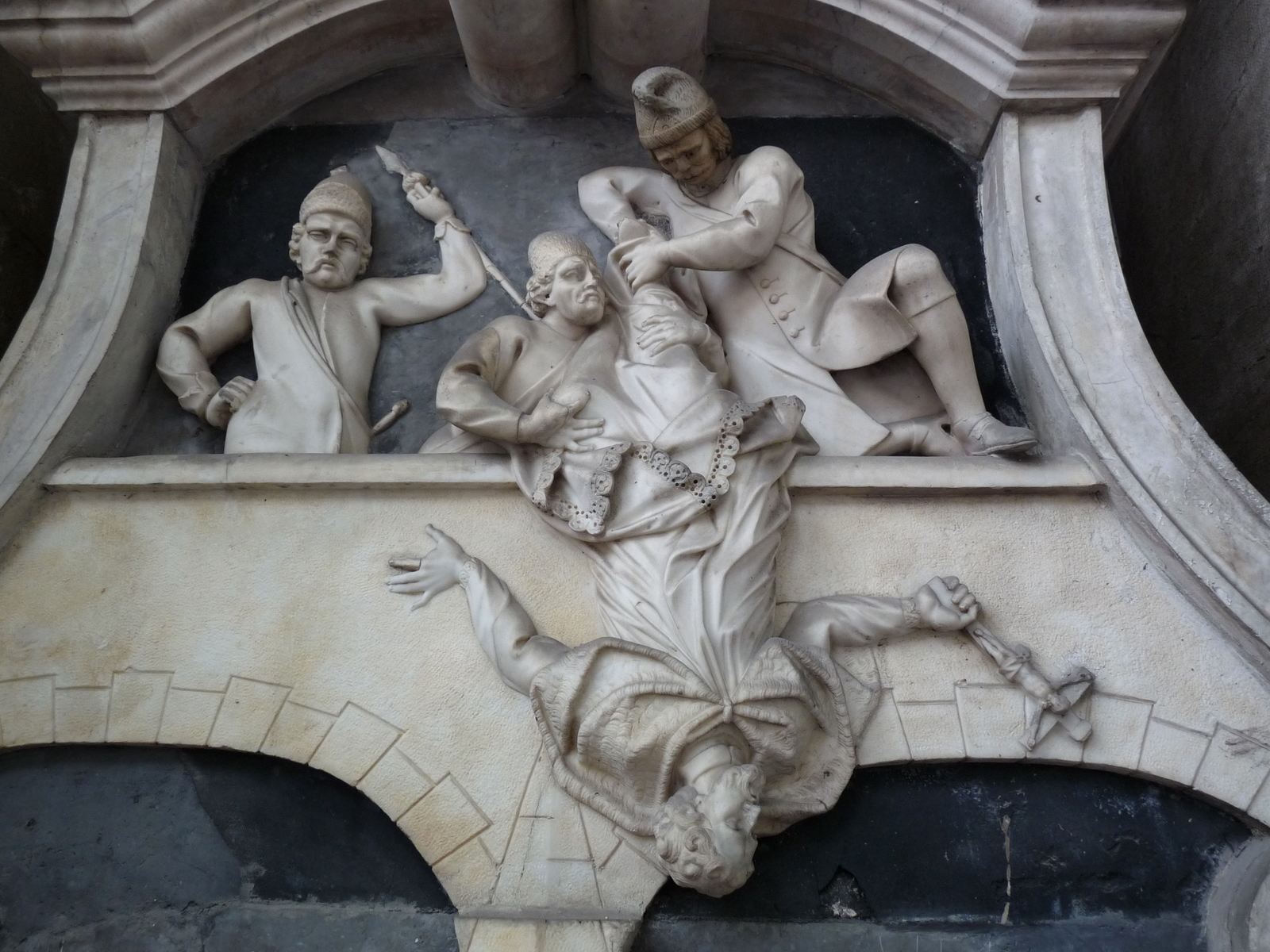
St. John of Nepomuk by Francesco Robba, statue on the facade of St. Florian's Church in Ljubljana

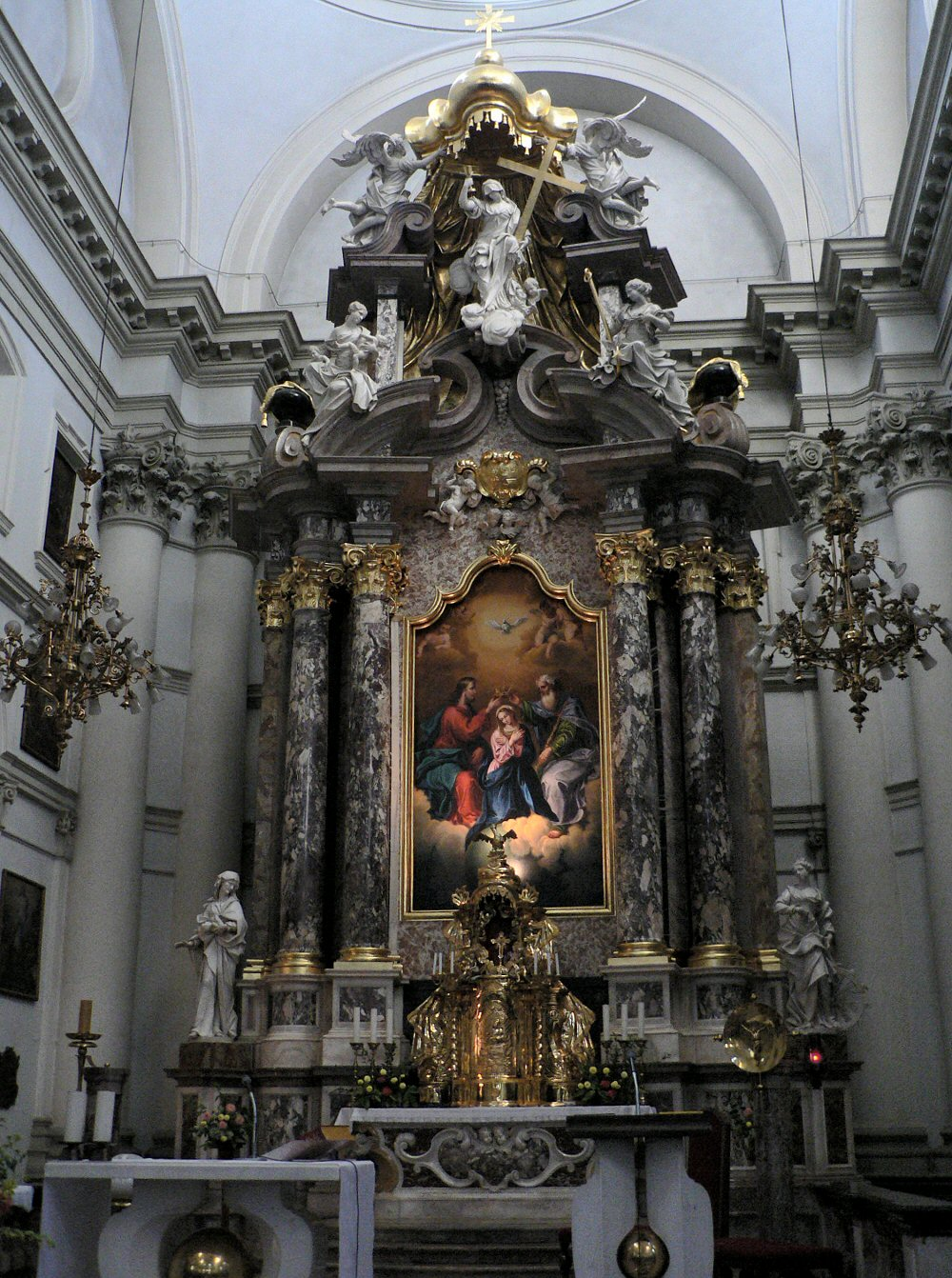
The main altar of the Ursuline Church of the Holy Trinity in Ljubljana

The best-known work by Francesco Robba is the Fountain of the Three Rivers of Carniola (1751), representing the Ljubljanica, the Sava and the Krka. It was inspired by the Bernini's Fountain of the Four Rivers on Piazza Navona and by the fountain on Piazza della Rotonda, both in Rome.

Other works include the Narcissus Fountain (Ljubljana), the main altar and the statues (1732) in St. James's Church (Ljubljana), an altar in Ljubljana Cathedral, the majority of the main altar in the Franciscan Church of the Annunciation (Ljubljana), a statue of St. John of Nepomuk in Klagenfurt (Austria) and an altar in the parish church in Vransko. Francesco Robba is also the creator of the main altar of the Ursuline Church of the Holy Trinity in Ljubljana and presumably also of the marble statue of the Holy Trinity Monument that stands in front of it.

The work of Francesco Robba was highlighted in an international scientific symposium, held in Ljubljana in November 1998. His works are exhibited at the major exhibition Baroque in 2025 at the National Gallery in Ljubljana.
