= St. Florian's Church (Ljubljana) =

Church in Ljubljana, Slovenia

Coordinates: 46°2′46.58″N 14°30′28.84″E

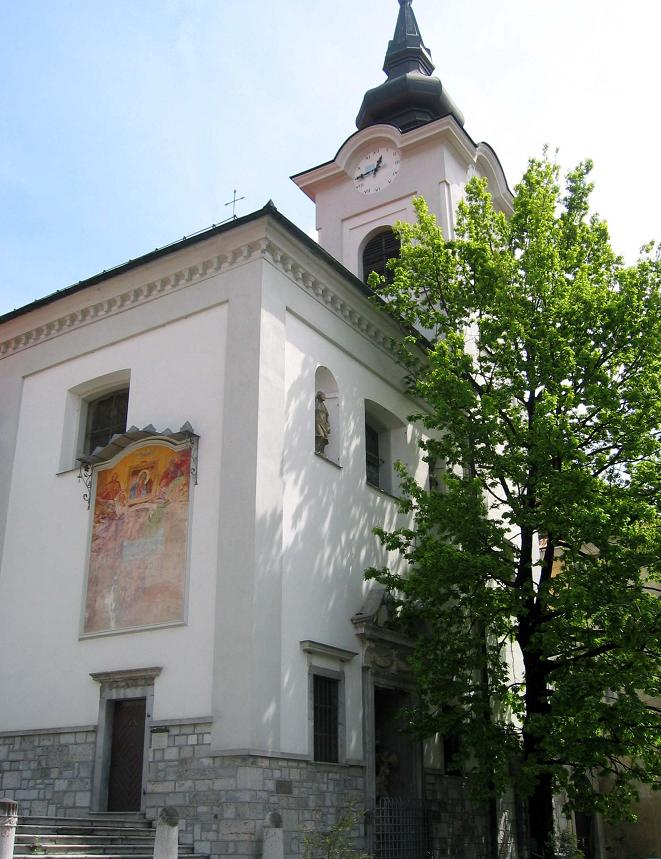
St. Florian's Church

St. Florian's Church (Slovene: Cerkev svetega Florijana, Šentflorjanska cerkev) is a Roman Catholic church at Upper Square (Gornji trg) in Ljubljana, the capital of Slovenia. Prior to its completion in 1696 and its construction after 1672, it was commissioned by Slovenian citizens in memory of the great fire which devastated the Stari trg and Gornji trg squares in 1660. It is a local church that belongs to St. James's Parish.

When the Jesuit order was re-established in Slovenia in 1870, St. Florian's became a center of Jesuit activity.
