= Ljubljana Town Hall =

Town hall in Ljubljana, Slovenia

Coordinates: 46°2′59.5″N 14°30′25″E

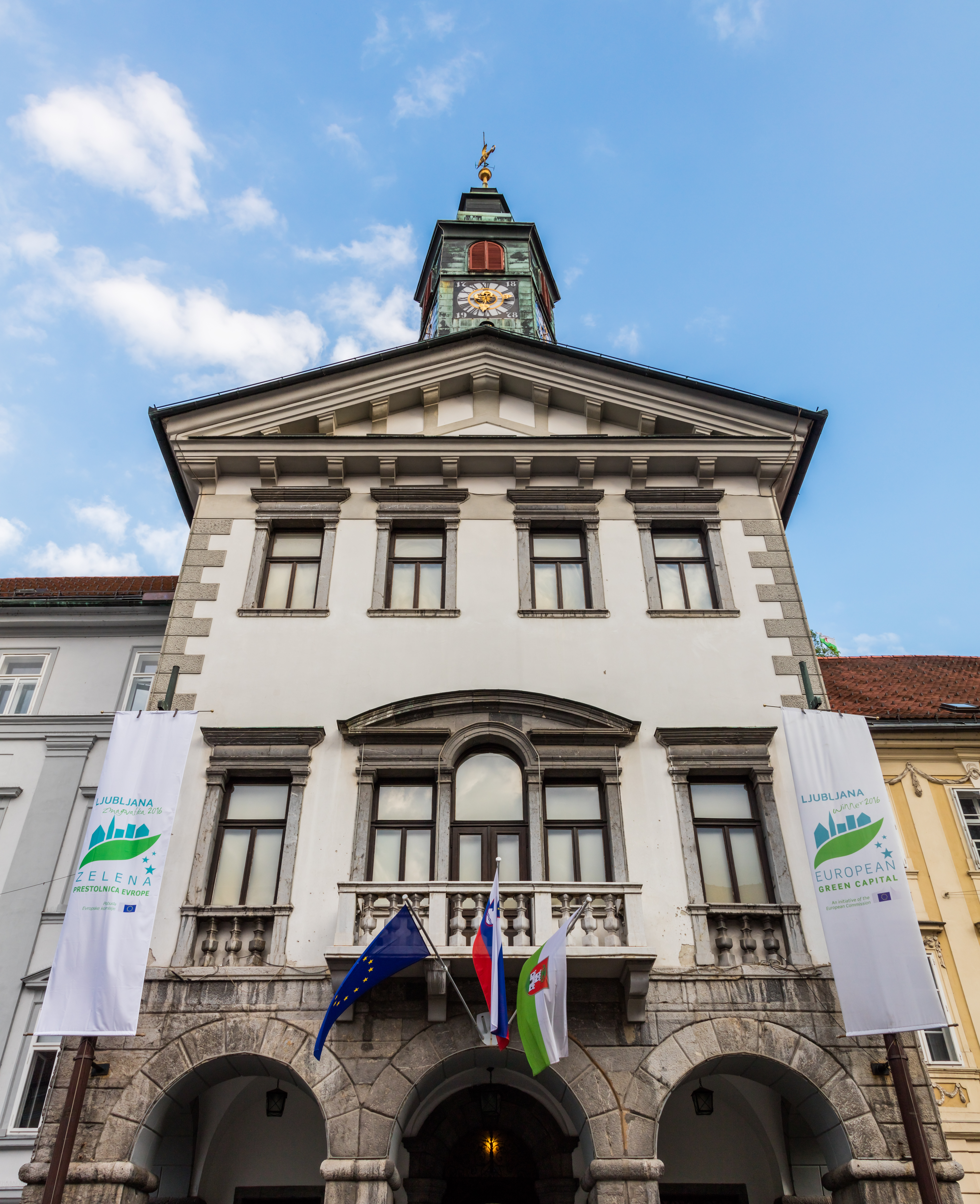
Ljubljana Town Hall

Ljubljana Town Hall (Slovene: Ljubljanska mestna hiša, also known as Ljubljanski rotovž or simply Rotovž or Magistrat) is the town hall in Ljubljana, the capital of Slovenia, is the seat of the City Municipality of Ljubljana. It is located at Town Square in the city centre close to Ljubljana Cathedral.

The original building was built in a Gothic style in 1484, probably according to plans by the Carniolan builder Peter Bezlaj. Between 1717 and 1719, the building underwent a Baroque renovation with a Venetian inspiration by the builder Gregor Maček, Sr., who built based on plans by the Italian architect Carlo Martinuzzi and on his own plans (the gable front, the loggia, and the three-part staircase). In the mid-1920s, a monument to the Serbian and first Yugoslav king Peter I was erected in the entrance of Town Hall. The monument, designed by the architect Jože Plečnik, was removed and destroyed by the Fascist Italian occupation authorities of the Province of Ljubljana in April 1941.

Outside the town hall stands a replica of the Baroque Robba Fountain, work of Francesco Robba. The original work, finished in 1751, is kept in the National Gallery.
