= Robba Fountain =

Fountain in Ljubljana, Slovenia

Coordinates: 46°3′0.41″N 14°30′25.12″E

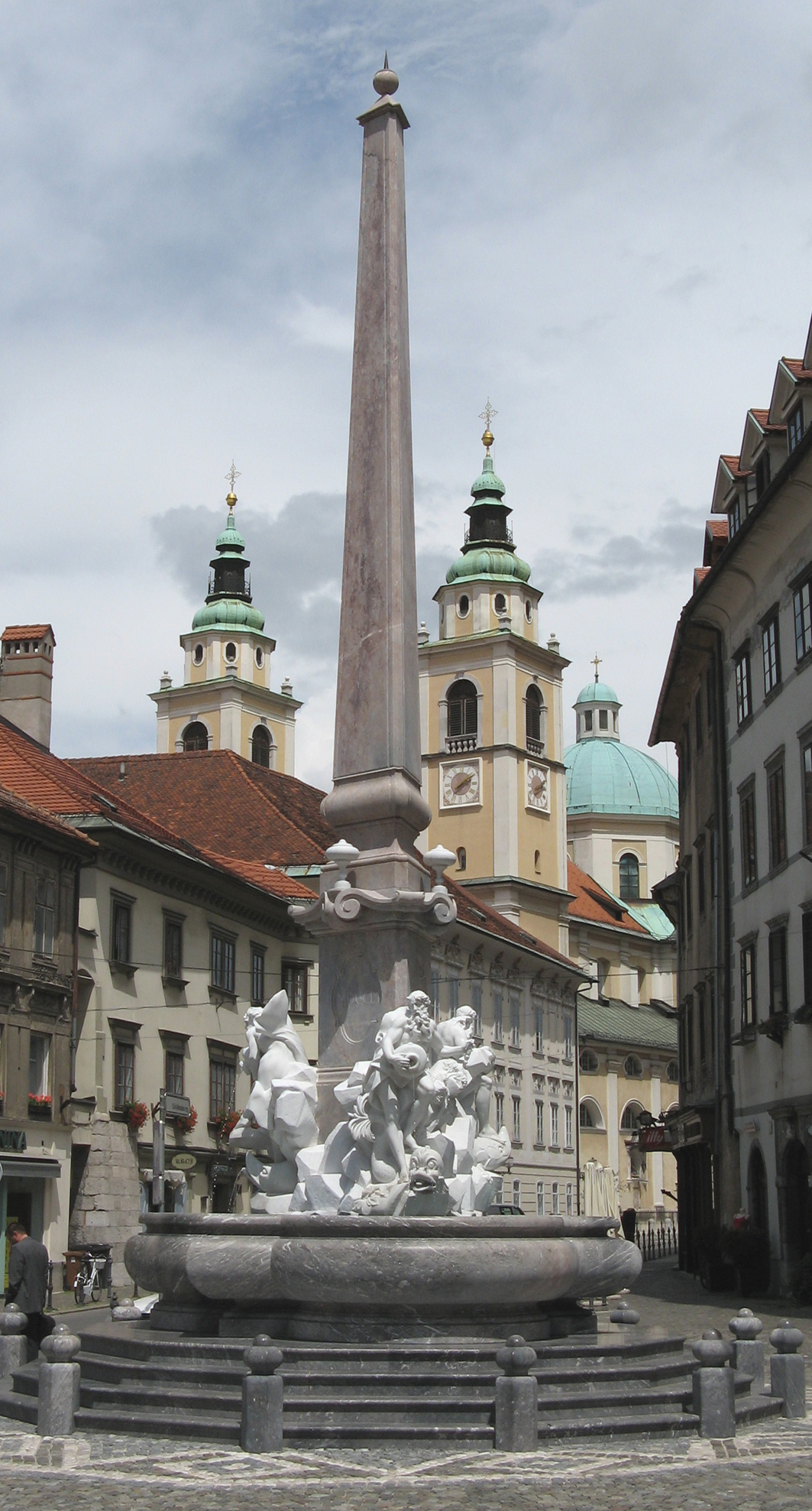
- Copy of the Robba fountain at Town Square. In the background, Ljubljana Cathedral.
- Artist: Francesco Robba
- Year: 1743–1751
- Type: Sculpture-fountain
- Location: Ljubljana

The Robba Fountain (Slovene: Robbov vodnjak), since the first half of the 20th century also known as the Fountain of the Three Carniolan Rivers (Vodnjak treh kranjskih rek), is the fountain that stands in front of Ljubljana Town Hall at Town Square in Ljubljana, the capital of Slovenia. It was originally made in 1751 by the Italian sculptor Francesco Robba and is one of the city's most recognisable symbols.

== History ==
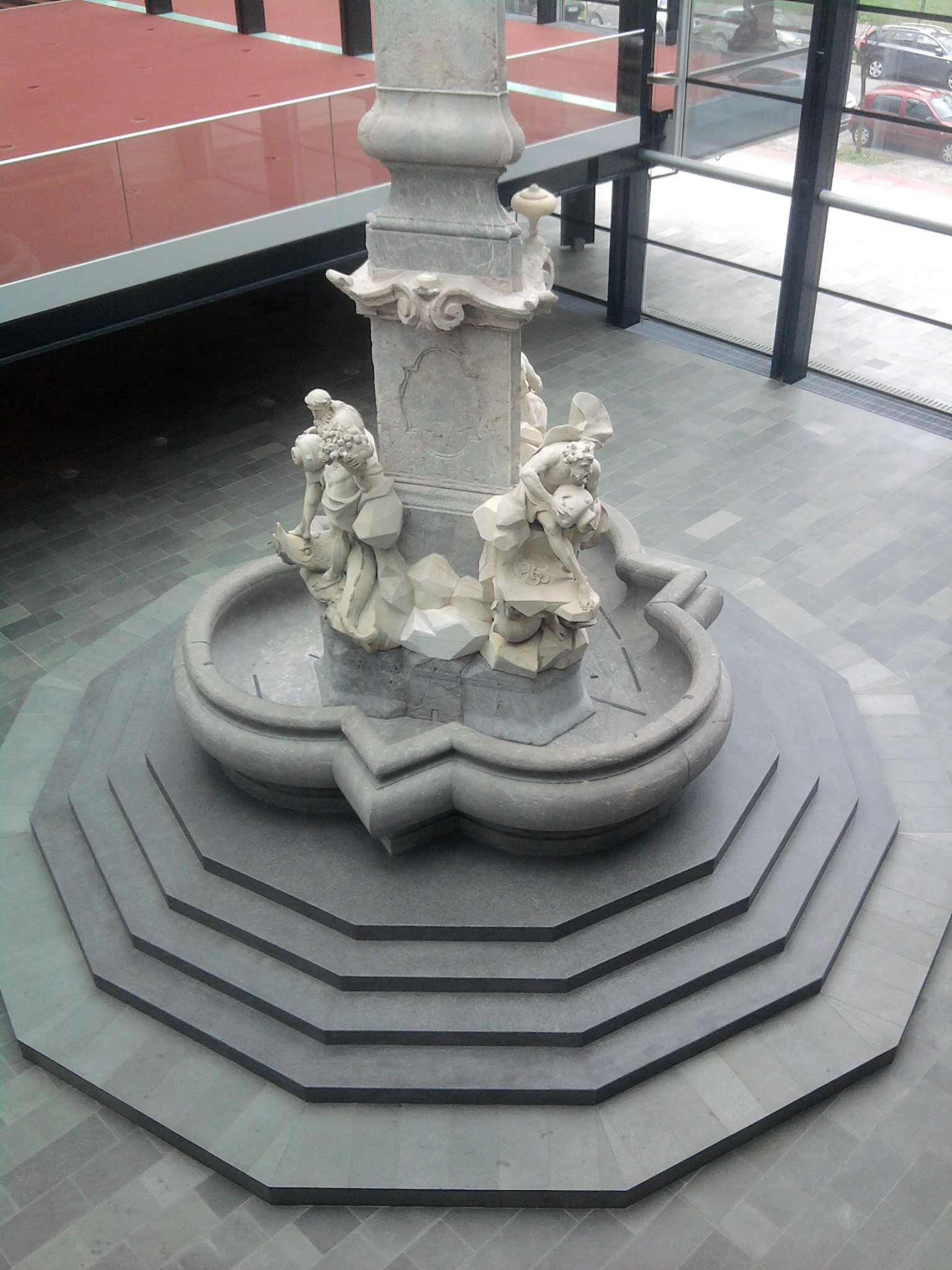
Original Robba Fountain, located at the National Gallery in Ljubljana

The fountain was commissioned from Francesco Robba by the city magistrate in 1743, after the old Neptune fountain had fallen into disrepair. It was intended as a representation of municipal authority and perceived as a symbol of the city's primacy in the Duchy of Carniola, while also serving the practical function of providing drinking water.

Robba drew his initial inspiration from Bernini's Fontana dei Quattro Fiumi (Fountain of the Four Rivers) at Piazza Navona during a visit to Rome, but his design more closely followed Fontana del Pantheon by Filippo Barigioni at Piazza della Rotonda. He skilfully adapted Barigioni's rectangular plan into a lighter and slimmer triangular form to suit the three directions from which people approached the Town Hall.

The figures were carved from Carrara marble, while most of the remaining structure was built from local Lesno Brdo stone because the ship transporting additional marble from Venice sank near Trieste. Transporting the obelisk alone from the quarry to Ljubljana took nearly thirteen days and required up to twenty pairs of oxen. Robba underestimated the costs and the work dragged on well beyond the planned two years, ultimately leading to his financial ruin. The fountain was finally unveiled in the autumn of 1751.

During the 19th and 20th centuries, the fountain underwent numerous alterations. The original steps and stone corner columns were lost, and the Carrara marble figures suffered considerable damage over time. After three decades of conservation efforts, the original was replaced by a replica at Town Square in 2006, and the restored original was installed in the National Gallery of Slovenia in 2008.

== Description ==
The fountain features a trefoil-shaped basin above a stepped base, with the steps representing the Carniolan mountains. At the base of the 10-metre (33 ft) obelisk stand three muscular male figures, each accompanied by a dolphin and holding a water jug. Several years after the fountain's installation, the figures came to be identified as the river gods of the Sava, Krka, and Ljubljanica, and later also as representations of the three territorial units of Carniola: Upper Carniola, Lower Carniola, and Inner Carniola. The figures are carved from Carrara marble, the obelisk from local Lesno Brdo stone, and the basin from Podpeč limestone.

== Cultural significance ==
After Slovenia declared independence from Yugoslavia, the Robba Fountain was portrayed by Rudi Španzel on the 5,000 Slovenian tolar banknote. It was in circulation from December 1993 until the introduction of the euro in January 2007. Since 2001, the fountain has been protected as a cultural monument of national significance.
