= Giulio Quaglio the Younger =

Italian painter

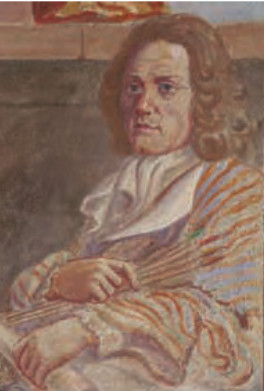
The only known self-portrait of Giulio Quaglio the Younger (Ljubljana Cathedral)

Giulio Quaglio the Younger (1668–1751) was an Italian Baroque painter. He was part of the large Quaglio pedigree of Italian artists involved in architecture, indoor fresco decoration, and scenography (stage design) for the court theaters. He was born and died in Laino, a mountain village at Como. Giulio II was involved in fresco decoration in Friuli, including for the chapel of Monte di Pietà at Udine. His most highly valued work is the painting of Saint Nicholas' Cathedral in Ljubljana. He also painted the central hall of Meerscheinschlössl in Graz. He had two sons, Domenico and Giovanni Maria Quaglio.

== Gallery ==
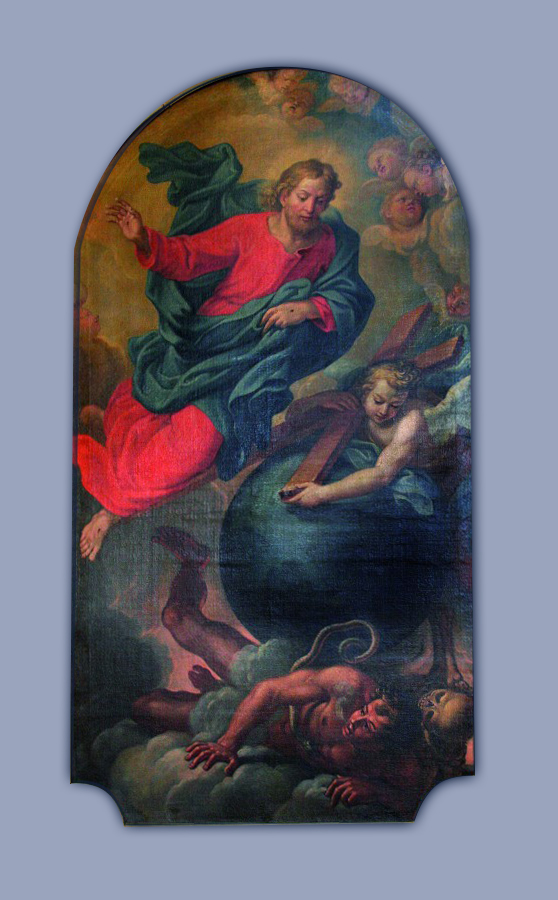
Christ the Savior (1721 - 1723)

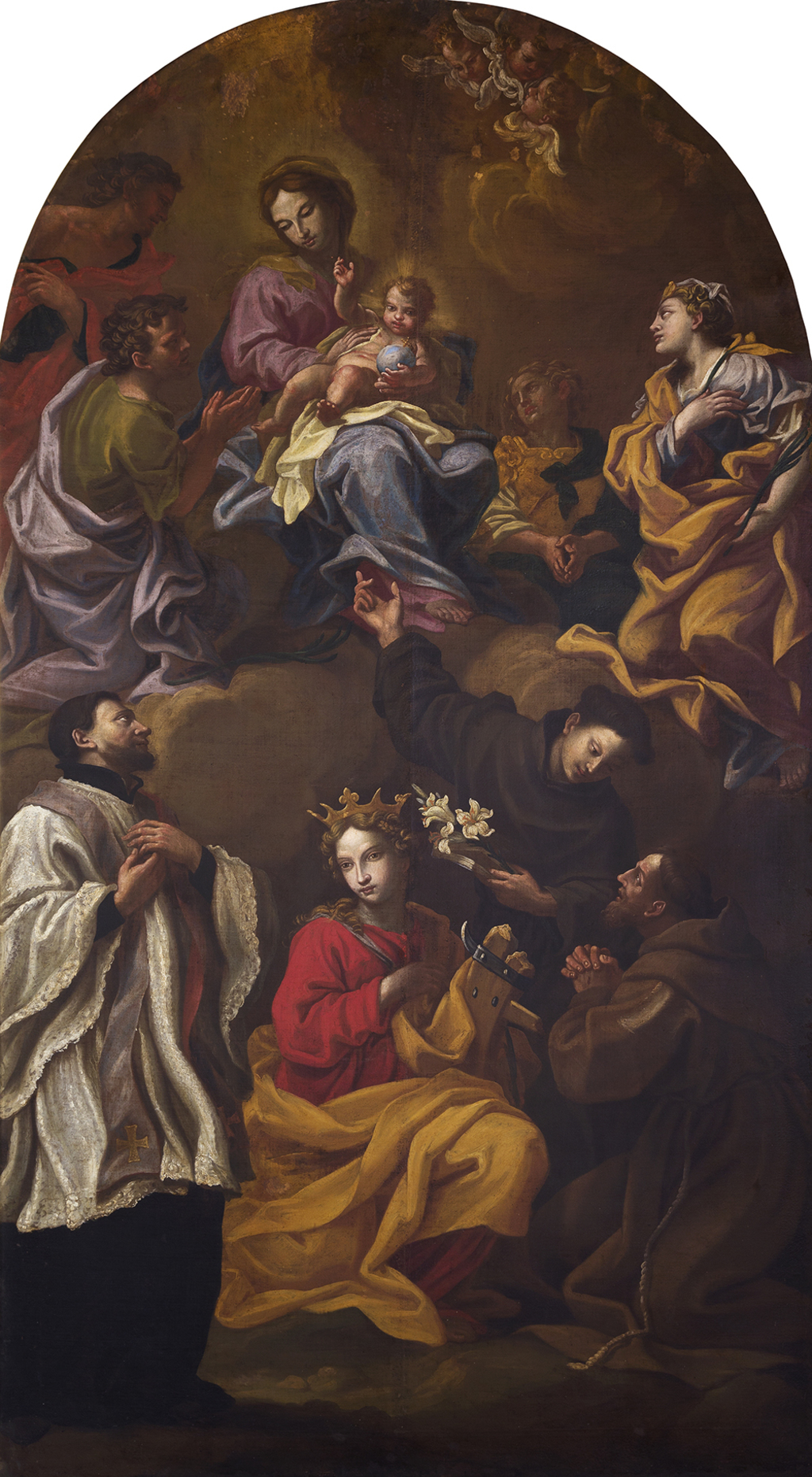
Mother of God with child among saints (1702)

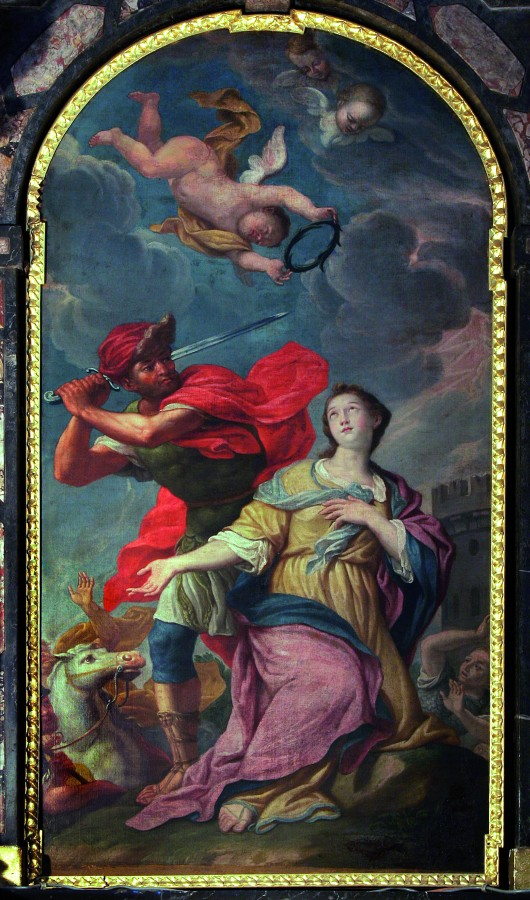
The beheading of St. Barbara (1721 - 1723)

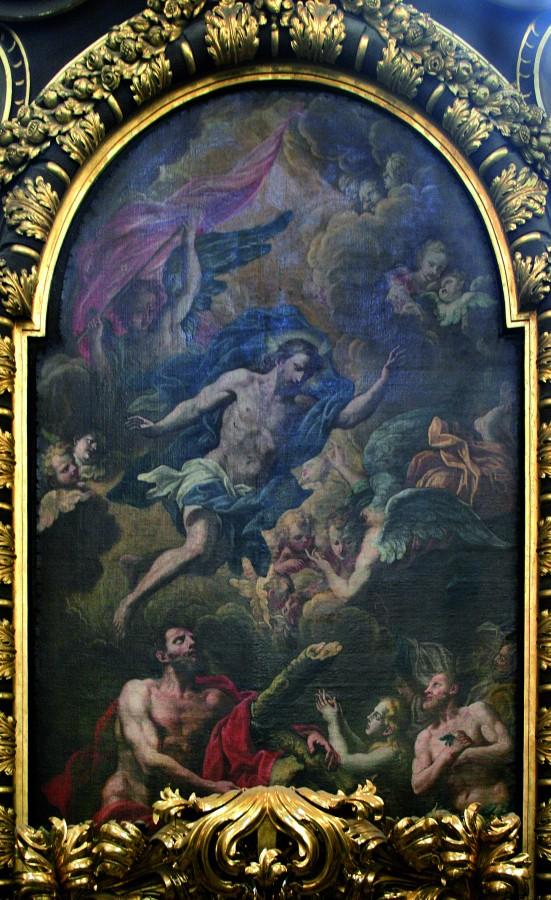
Christ with St. Dyzmo in purgatory (1704)

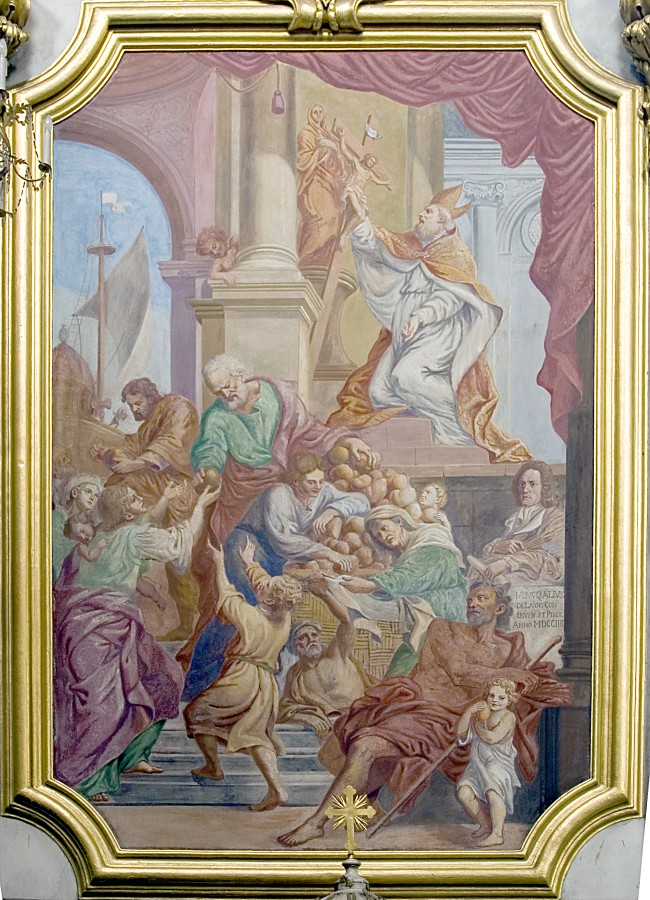
St. Nicholas saves the townspeople Myra from starvation (1704)

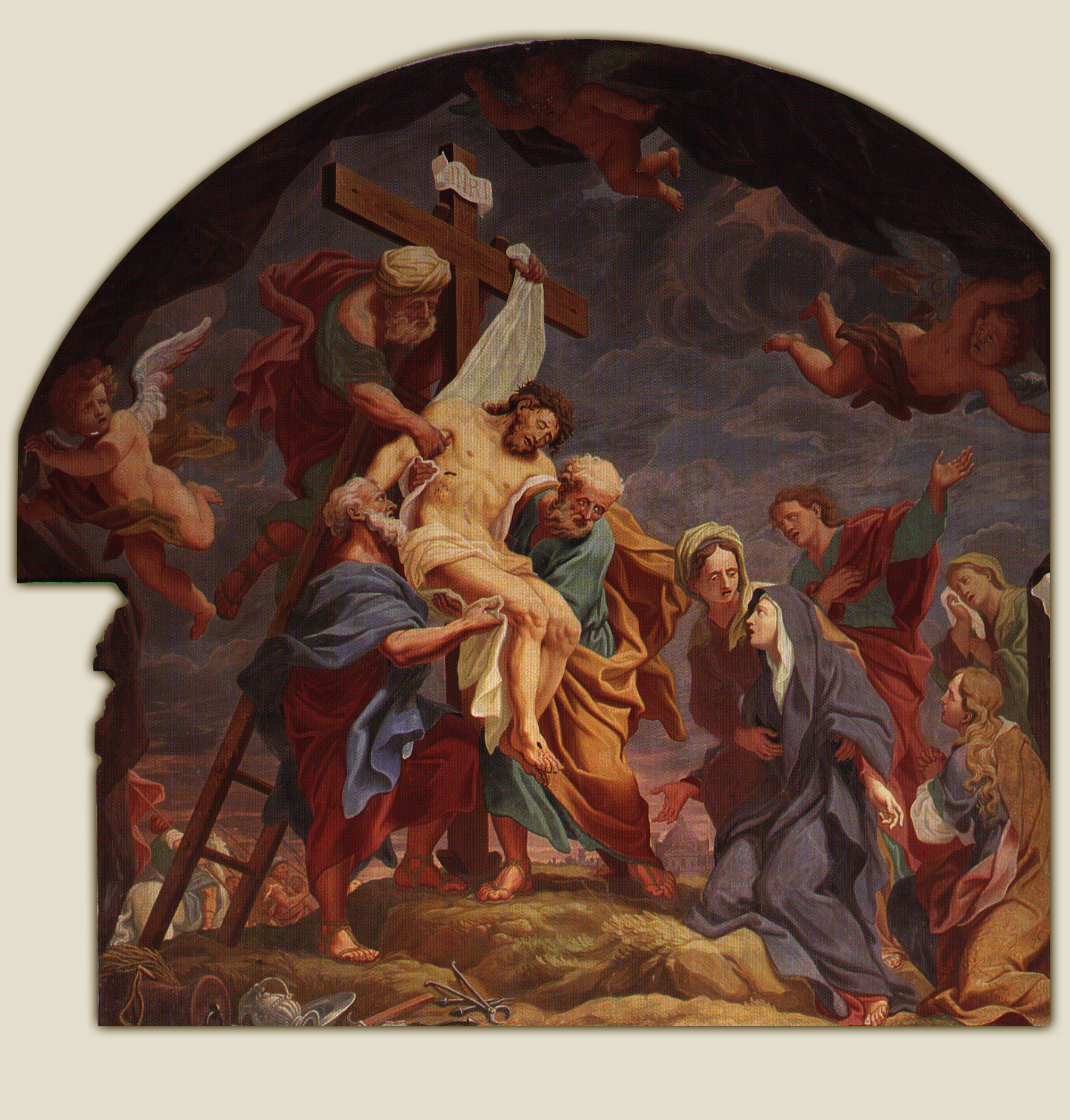
Ascension from the cross (1706)

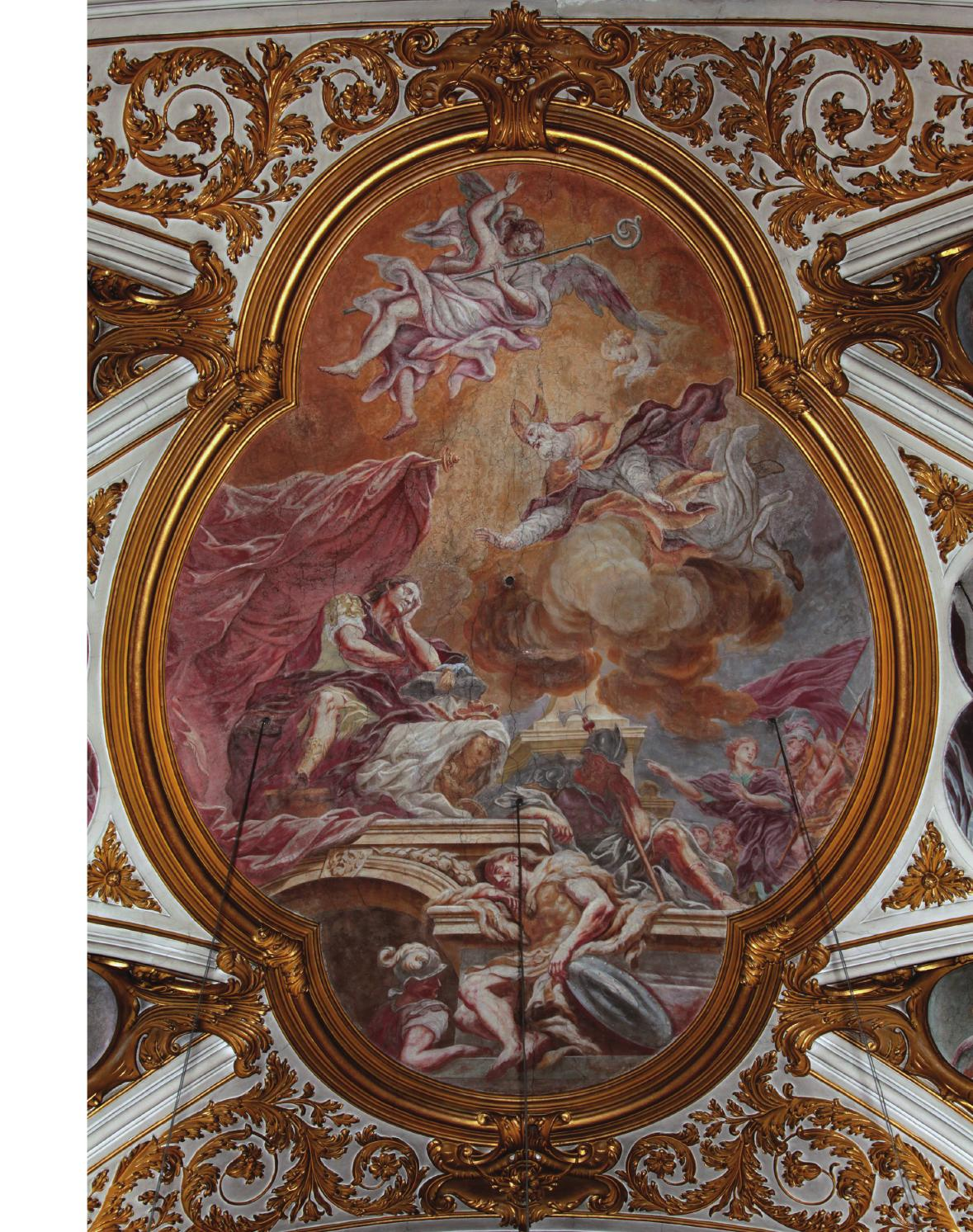
Saint Nicholas quarreled with Emperor Fredericus

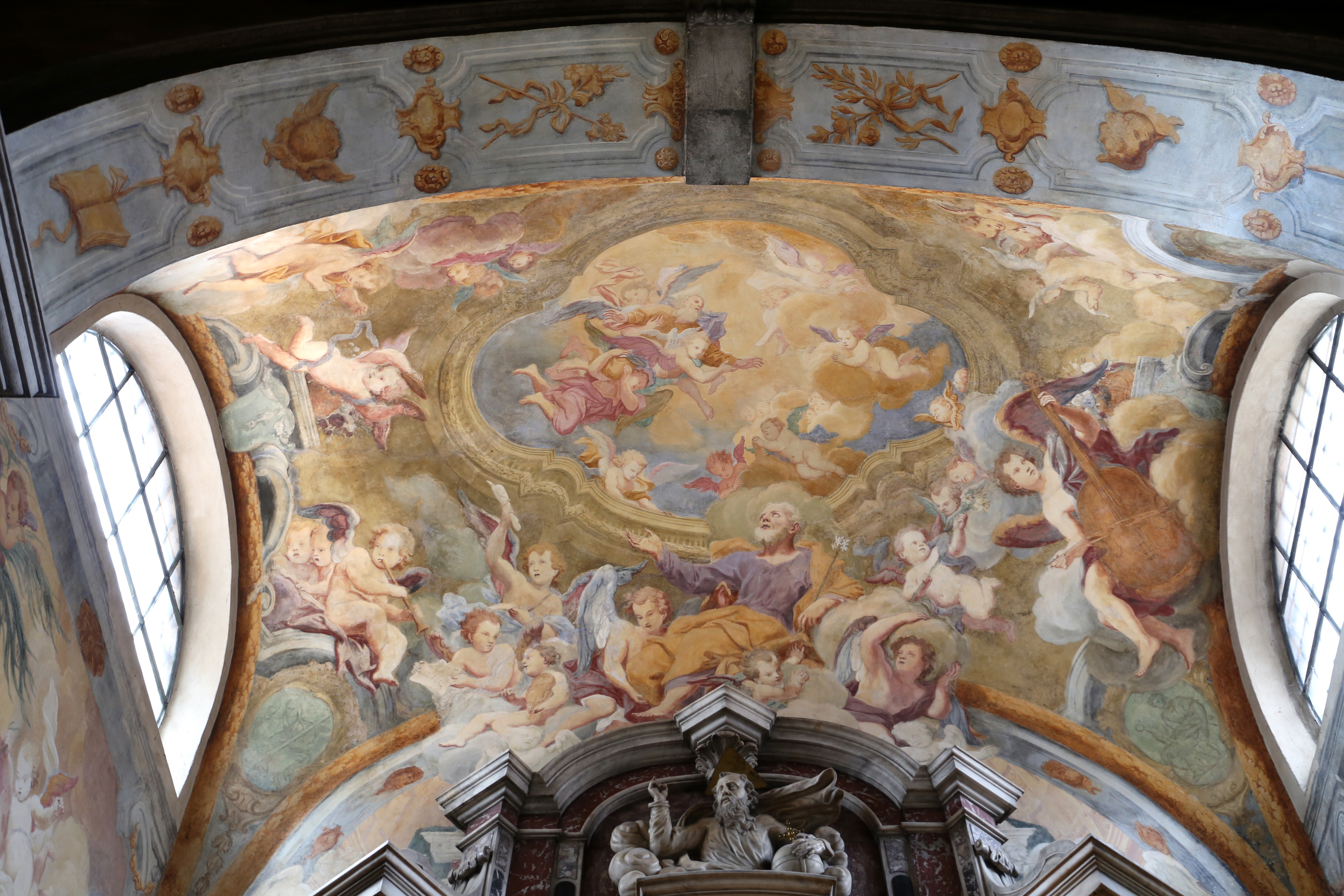
Interior of Trieste Cathedral

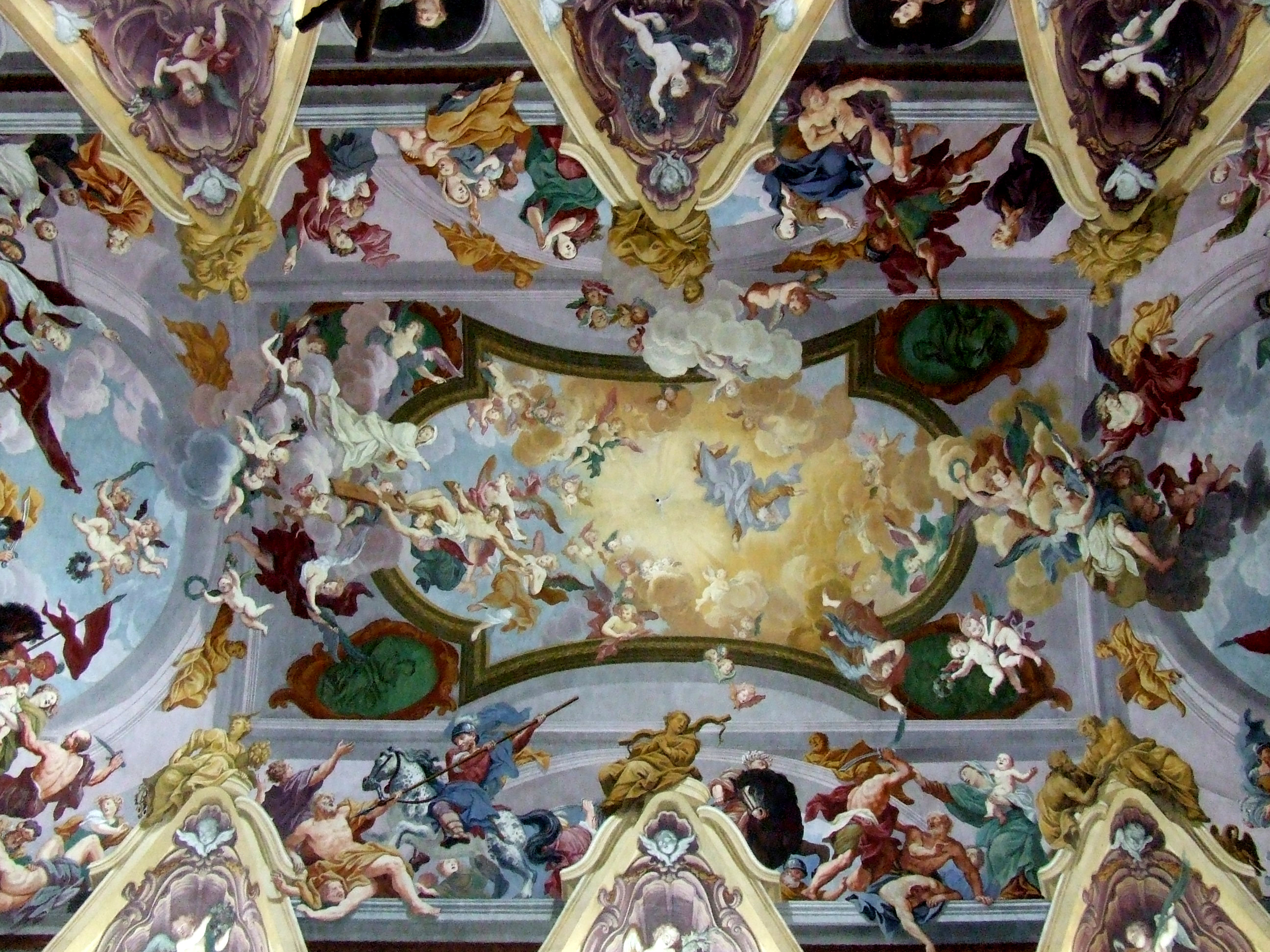
Interior of Ljubljana Cathedral

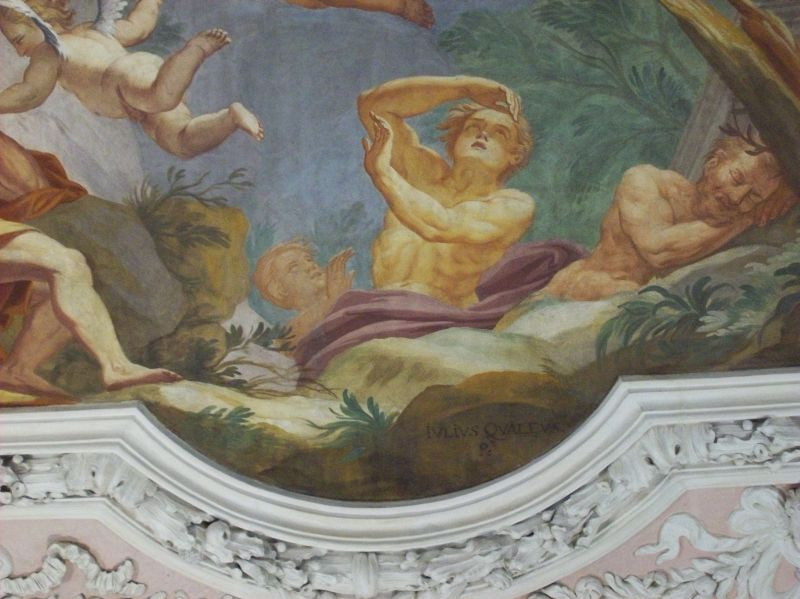
Fresco detail from Palazzo d'Attimis Maniago with the painter's signature visible
