= Ljubljana Cathedral =

Cathedral in Ljubljana, Slovenia

- ljubljanska stolnica
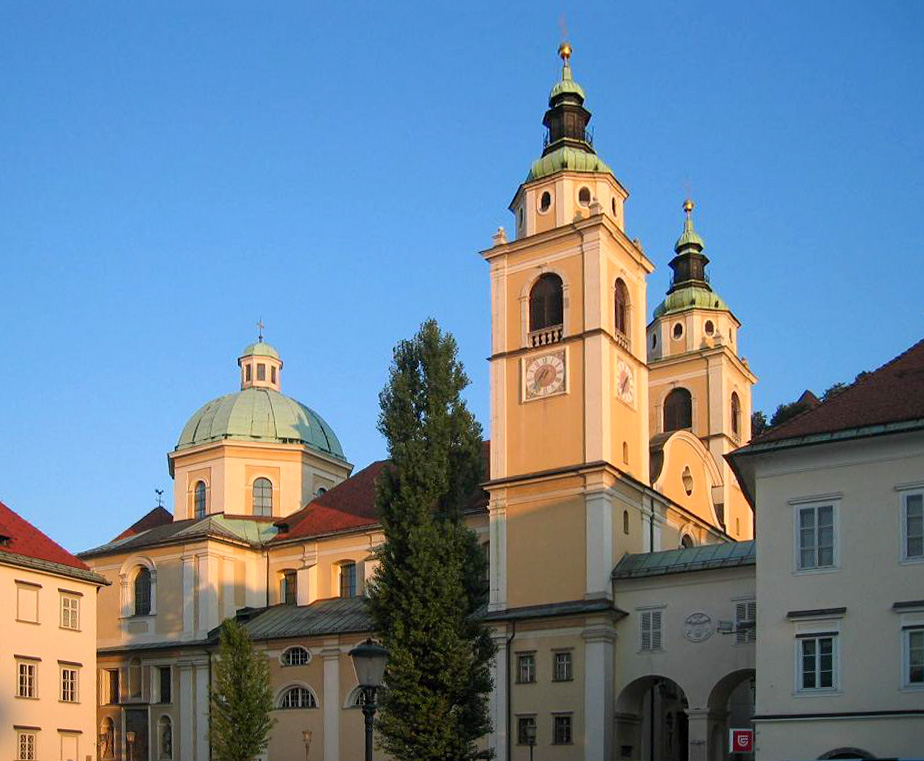
- Cathedral viewed from the north (Pogačar Square)

Religion
- Affiliation: Catholic
- District: Archdiocese of Ljubljana
- Ecclesiastical or organisational status: Cathedral
- Year consecrated: 1707

Location
- Location: Ljubljana, Slovenia
- Interactive map of Ljubljana Cathedral
- Coordinates: 46°03′02″N 14°30′28″E

Architecture
- Architect: Andrea Pozzo
- Type: Church
- Style: Baroque
- Groundbreaking: 1701
- Completed: 1706

Specifications
- Dome: 1
- Dome height (outer): 24 m (79 ft)
- Spire: 2

Website
- www.stolnica.si

Ljubljana Cathedral (Slovene: ljubljanska stolnica), officially named Saint Nicholas's Church (cerkev sv. Nikolaja, unofficially also šenklavška cerkev), also named Saint Nicholas's Cathedral (Slovene: stolnica sv. Nikolaja), the Cathedral of Saint Nicholas, or simply the Cathedral (stolnica), is a cathedral in Ljubljana, the capital of Slovenia. Originally, Ljubljana Cathedral was a Gothic church. In the early 18th century, it was replaced by a Baroque building. It is an easily recognizable landmark of the city with its green dome and twin towers and stands at Cyril and Methodius Square (Ciril-Metodov trg) by the nearby Ljubljana Central Market and Town Hall.

== History ==
=== Predecessor churches ===
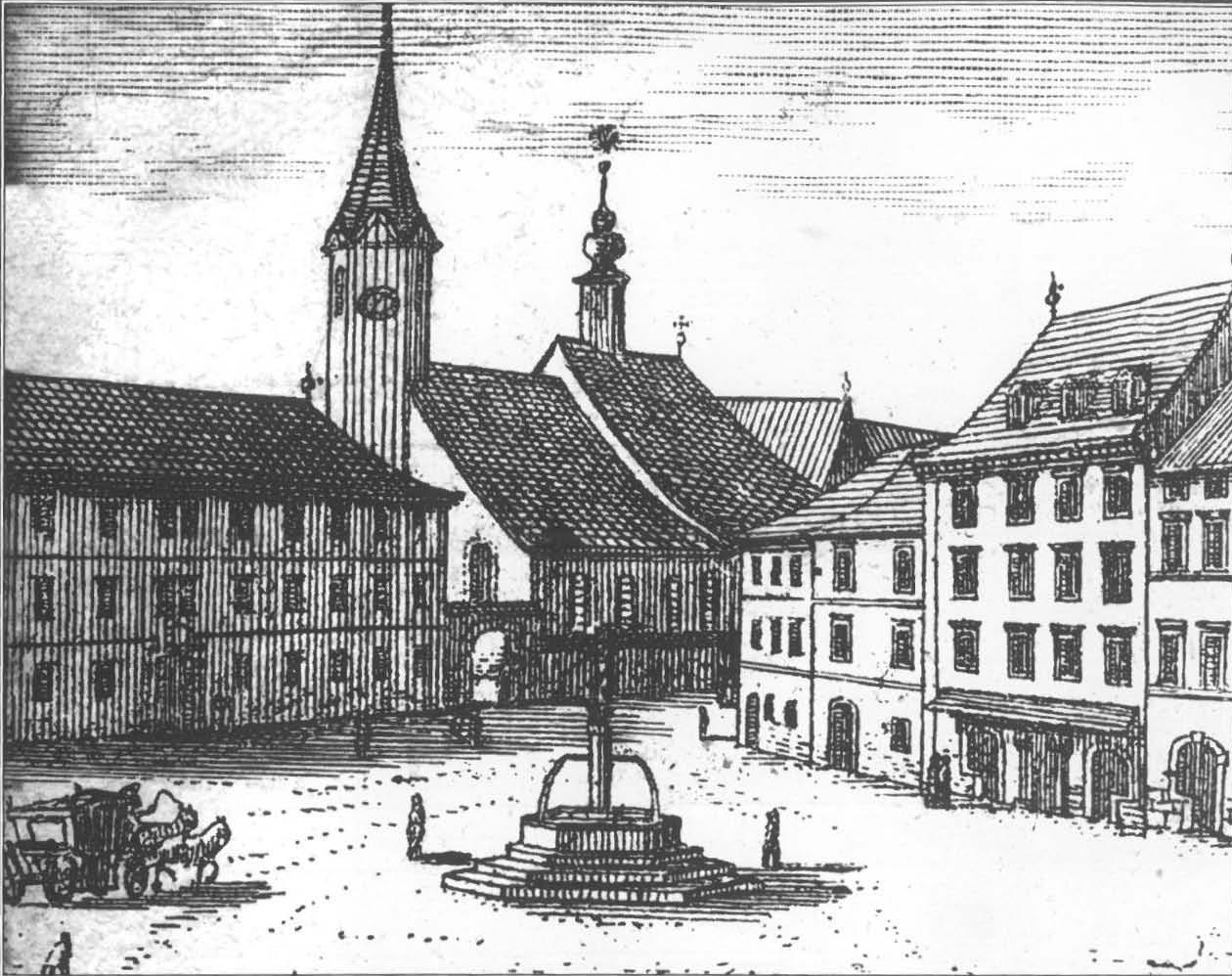
Depiction of the old Ljubljana Cathedral from The Glory of the Duchy of Carniola (1689)

The site was originally occupied by an aisled three-nave Romanesque church, the oldest mention of which dates from 1262. It was a succursal church of the ancient Parish of Saint Peter. An extensive fire in 1361 saw it refurbished in the Gothic style but underwent alterations when the Diocese of Ljubljana was established in 1461 and the church became a cathedral. However, in 1469 it was burnt down again. This time, it was suspected to be arson, presumably by the Turks.

=== Baroque cathedral ===
In 1700, at the initiative of Dean Johann Gregor Thalnitscher (Dolničar) and the Academia Operosorum Labacensium, the Capuchin friar Florentianus Ponnensis from Milan or Bologna designed a new Baroque hall church. The following year, after the construction already started, the plan was revised and complemented by the Jesuit architect Andrea Pozzo who designed it as a basilica and added to it a dome. He did not supervise the realisation of his plan, so the buildings was significantly adapted by the builders, in particular by Francesco Bombassi of Venice. The two belfries, resembling of the Salzburg Cathedral, were added upon the plan by Lombard Giulio Quaglio.

The construction took place between 1701 and 1706. It was led by Francesco Bombasi, who already after a few months replaced the unreliable Francesco Feratta, and Mihael Zamerl. The master builder was Pavel Jugovic, and after his death in March 1704, Gregor Maček, Sr. The construction was completed in 1706, the first worship took place in the new building in August 1706, and the consecration took place on 8 May 1707.

== Description ==
=== Exterior ===
The church, oriented towards the east, is recognisable by its octagonal dome above the crossing at the eastern side, and two belfries at the western side. The dome with a cupola that replaced a painted one in 1841, was built by Matej Medved, whereas carpenter works were carried out by Jurij Pajk. The belfries were built in 1705–06 and have been decorated with gilded apples. Various relics and parchment inscriptions have been stored in them. The church towers have six bells, including the second oldest bell in Slovenia, dated to 1326, a bell by Gasparo de Franchi from 1706, and five bells by the Strojne Livarne factory. Between the belfries, there is a segmented semicircular gable, a 1989 reconstruction of the original Baroque gable that was after the 1895 Ljubljana earthquake replaced by the builder Franz Faleschini with a triangular one according to plans by the architect Raimund Jeblinger.

The facades of the church are decorated with 19th-century and 20th-century niches containing statues of bishops and saints, with Baroque frescoes, and with ancient Roman tombstones and some others named the Thalnitscher stone monument collection (Dolničarjev lapidarij), which was created in the early 18th century at the initiative of the historian Johann Gregor Thalnitscher. On the southern wall there is a side entrance in the eastern part and a brightly decorated Gothic pietà in the western part, a copy of one that used to be in the earlier Gothic cathedral. A sundial with Roman numerals and a Latin motto (Nescitis diem neque horam – "You don't know the day or the hour"), dated to 1826, also decorates the southern facade. It was renovated in 1989. The western facade with the main entrance is decorated with a plaque to the right of the entrance bearing a ceiling boss from the old Ljubljana cathedral in the form of Christ's head and the Latin inscription "Memoria veteris ecclesiae cathedralis ("old memories of the cathedral church").

There are six sandstone statues of bishops and saints in the niches of the cathedral. The niches of the southern facade contain the Gothic pietà, and statues of Saint Hermagoras and Saint Fortunatus, made of sandstone in 1872 by the sculptor Franc Ksaver Zajec. The niches of the western facade (next to the main entrance) contain a statue of Thomas Aquinas and a statue of Saint Bonaventura by the sculptor Ivan Pengov (1912), the northern facade's niches contain a statue of Sigismund von Lamberg, the first bishop of Ljubljana, and of Ljubljana's Bishop Thomas Chrön, both created in 1913, also by Pengov.

The entrances have bronze sculptured doors from 1996, created at the 1250s anniversary of Christianity in the Slovenian territory and the visit of Pope John Paul II. The front door, now named the Slovene Door, bears a relief by Tone Demšar with a depiction of Slovene history to commemorate the 1250th anniversary of Christianity in Slovenia. The side door, now named the Ljubljana Door, was redesigned by Mirsad Begić, who decorated them with portraits of the 20th-century bishops of Ljubljana. Subsequently, an automatic electric door has been added beyond the main door.

=== Interior ===
Inside much of the original Baroque decor remains with frescoes painted by Giulio Quaglio between 1703–1706 and later 1721–1723. Other notable decorations in the cathedral include the altar angels by the brothers Paolo and Giuseppe Groppelli on the right part of the nave (1711) and by Francesco Robba on the left (1745–1750). Angelo Putti created the statues of the four bishops of Emona seated under the dome beam (1712–1713), the bust of Johann Anton Thalnitscher (1715), and the reliefs of angels in the spherical triangles at the altar of the Holy Trinity. The dome was painted by Matevž Langus in 1843–44. The fresco in the cupola depicts the Holy Spirit and angels, whereas the frescos on the walls of the dome depict the coronation of the Virgin and the glorification of Saint Nicholas, surrounded by angels and saints. In the 1950s, the architect Jože Plečnik made plans for new church furnishings.

== Gallery ==
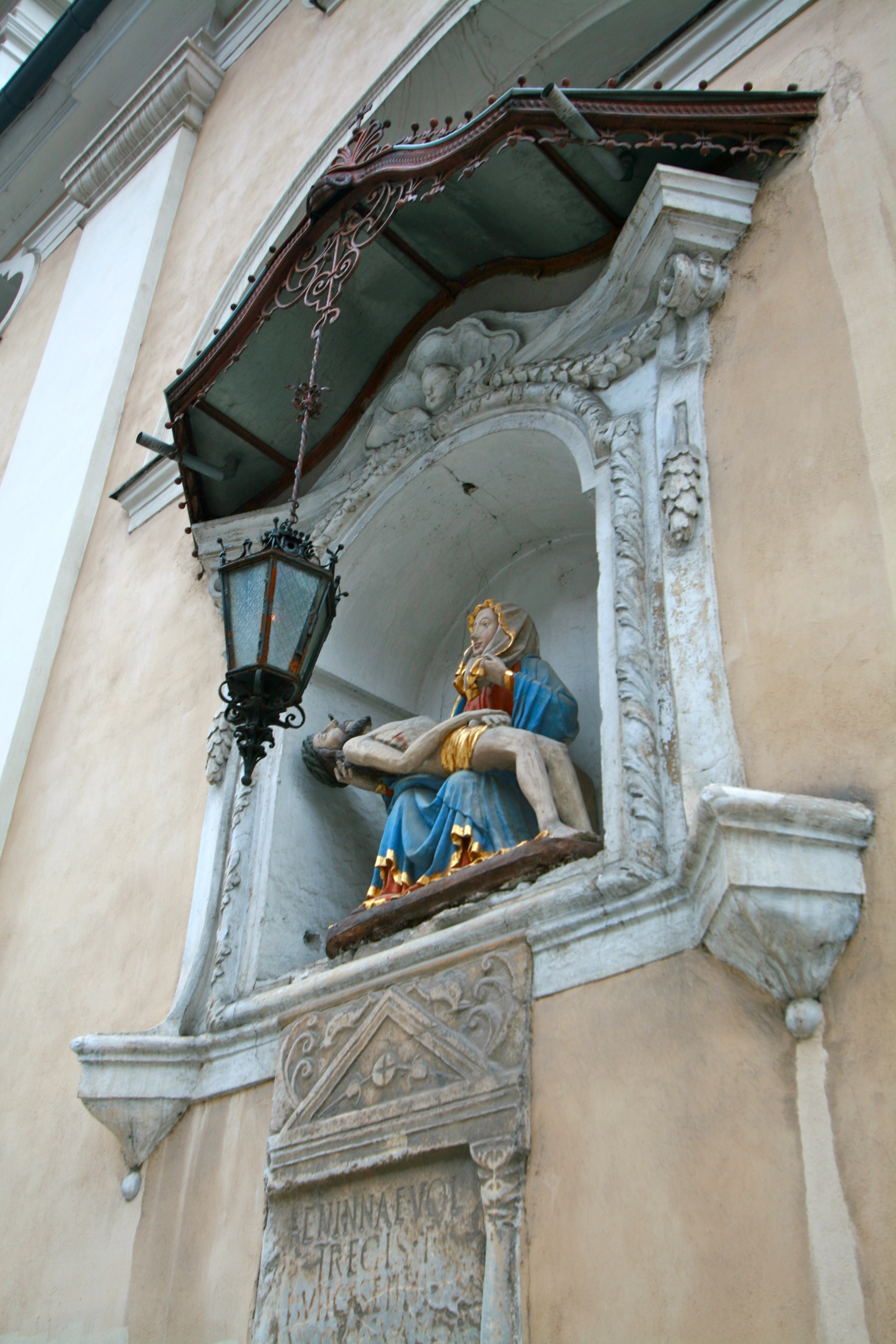
Pietà in the southern cathedral wall

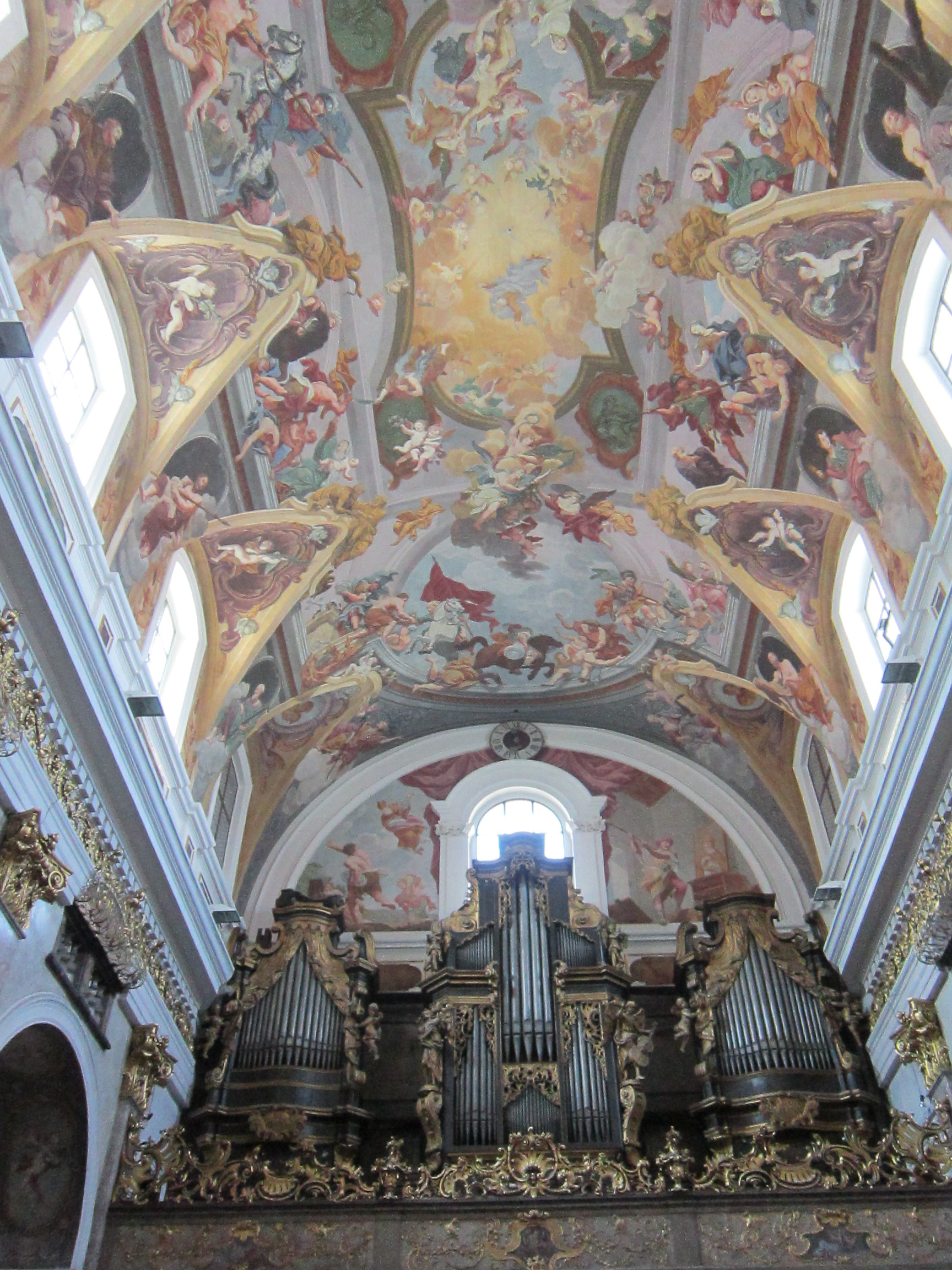
Cathedral ceiling and organs

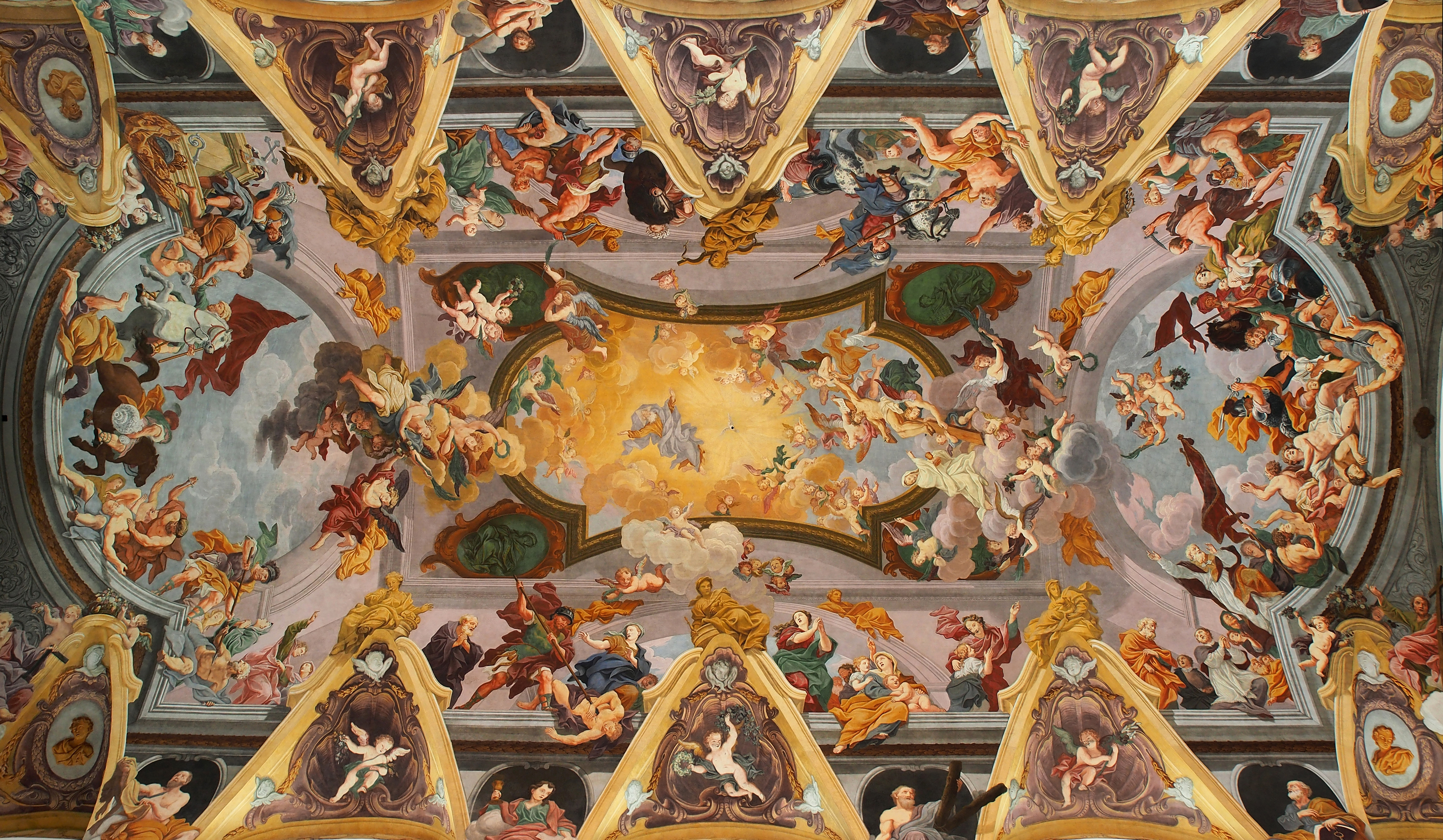
Fresco by Giuglio Quaglio on the cathedral ceiling

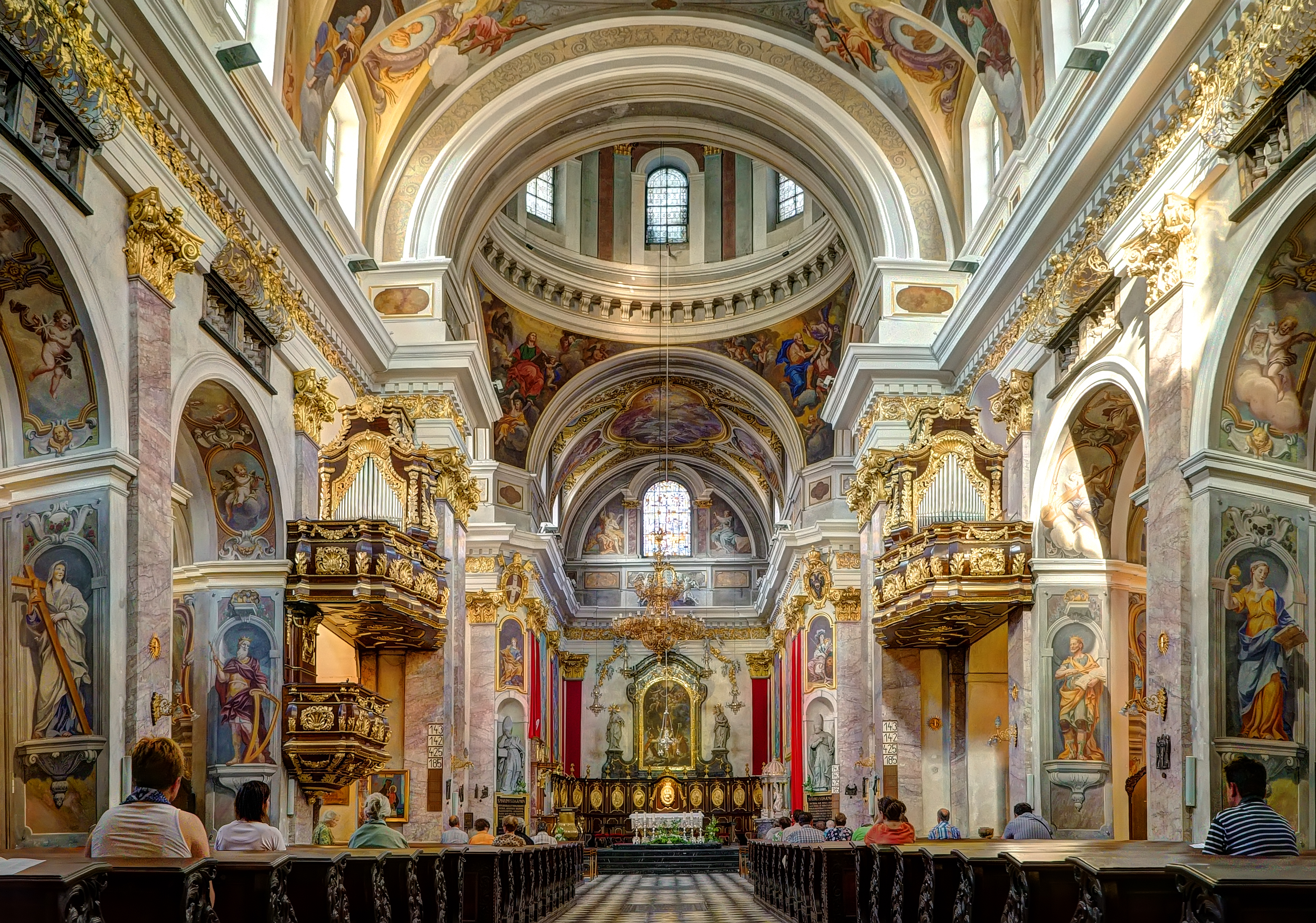
Interior with the main altar

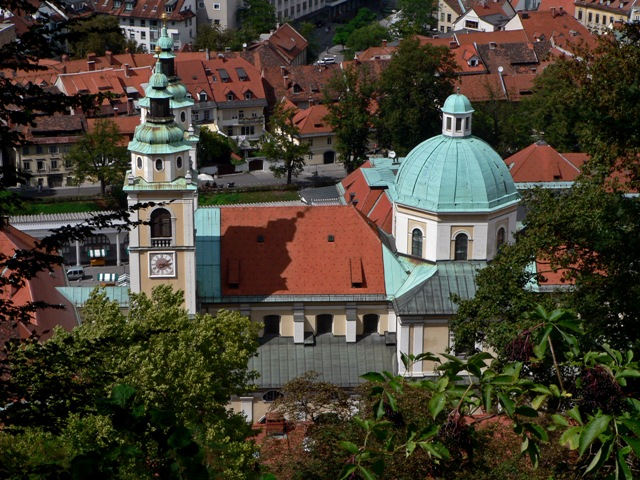
Cathedral viewed from Ljubljana Castle

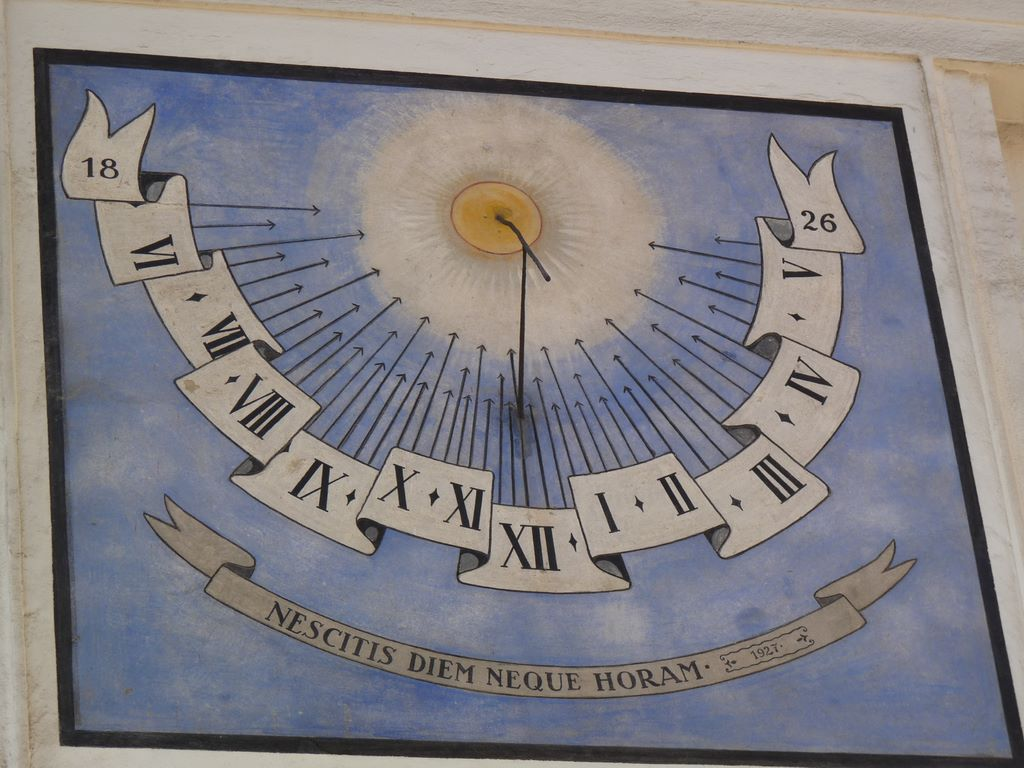
Sundial on the cathedral facade

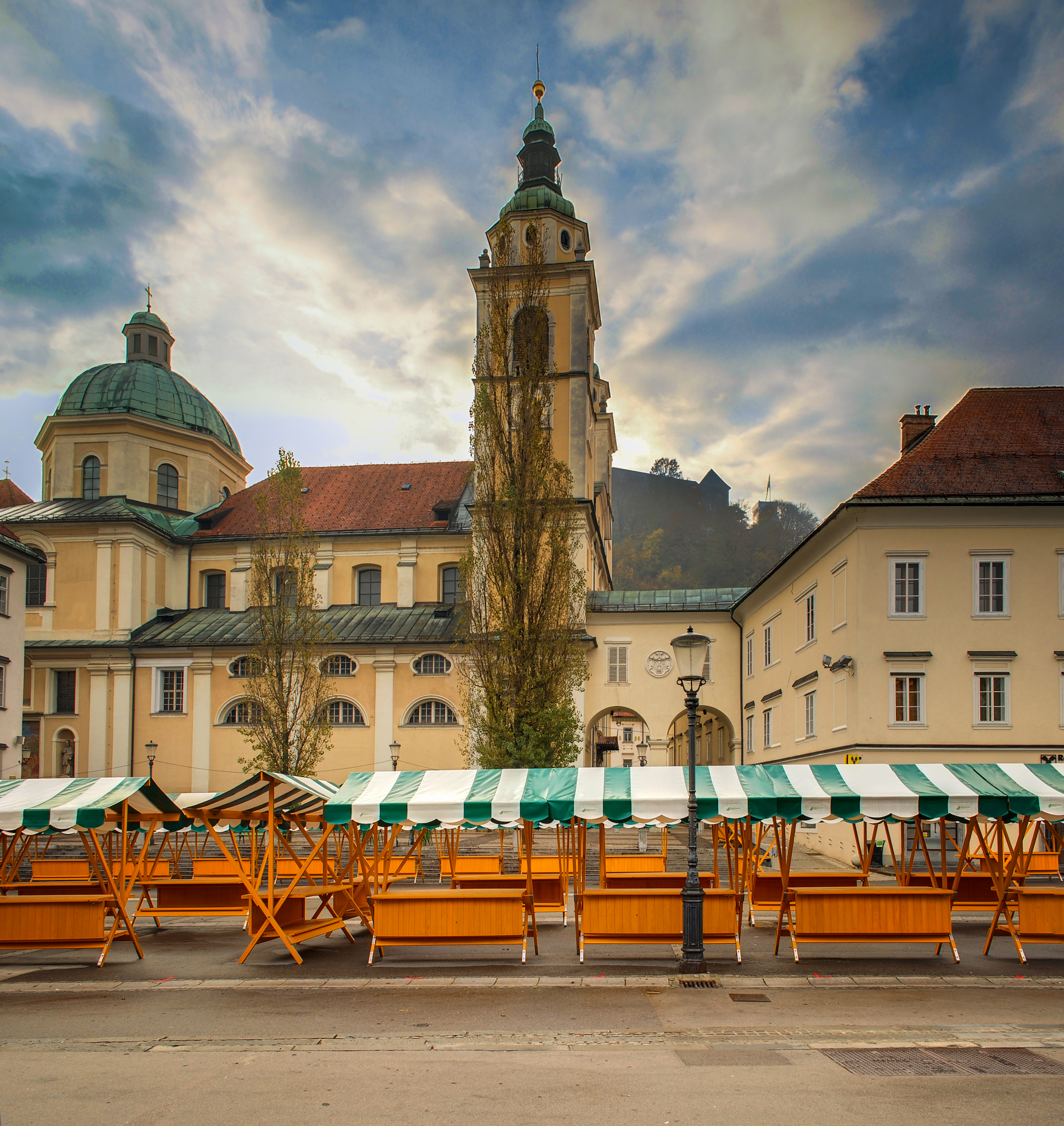
Pogačar Square in front of the cathedral
