= Town Square (Ljubljana) =

Square in Ljubljana, Slovenia

Coordinates: 46°3′0.6″N 14°30′25″E

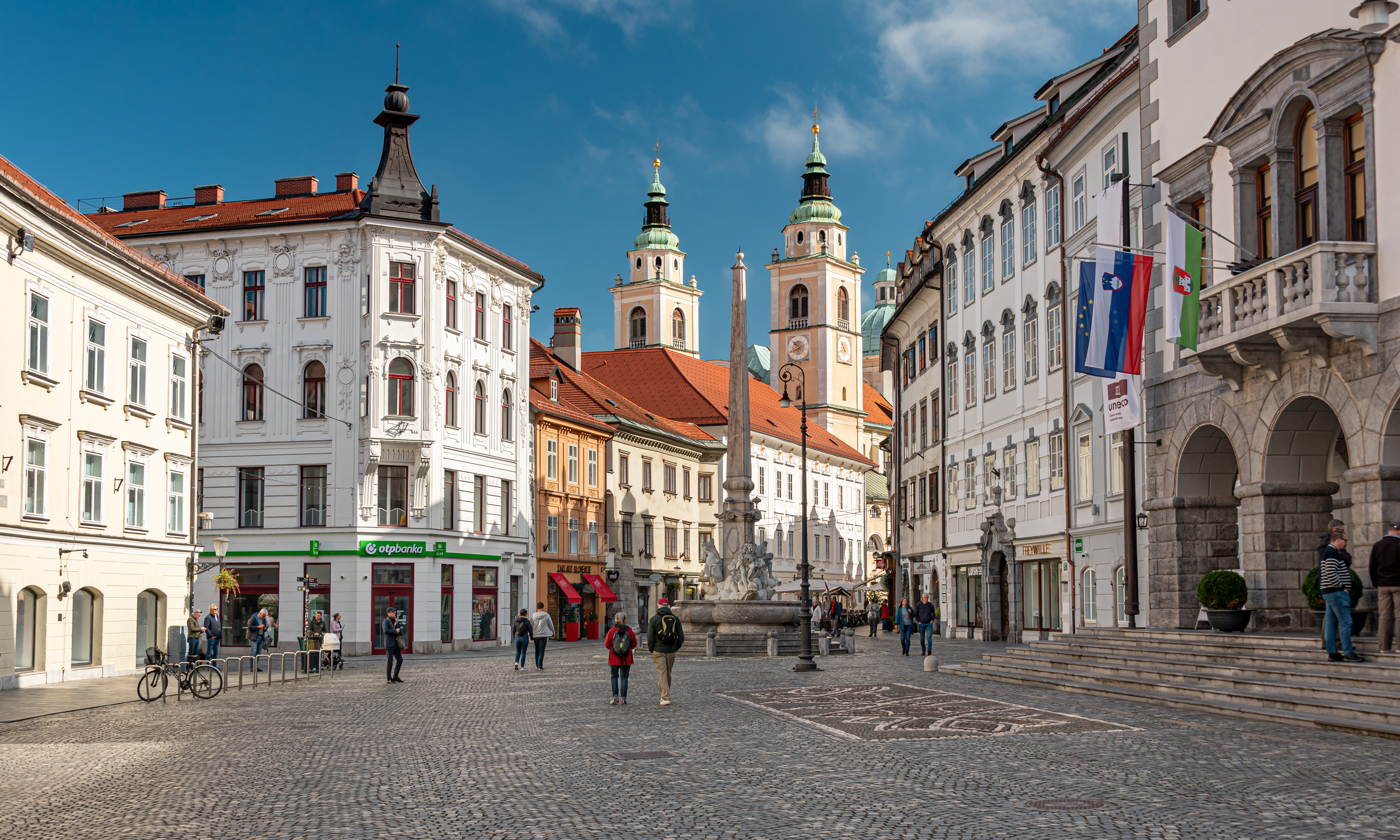
Town Square in Ljubljana

Town Square (Slovene: Mestni trg) is a major square in Ljubljana, the capital of Slovenia. Ljubljana Town Hall is located at the square. In front of Town Hall stands a copy of the Robba Fountain. Near the square, at Cyril and Methodius Square, stands Ljubljana Cathedral. Opposite Town Hall is the Krisper House, where Julija Primic, the inspiration of the Slovene Romantic poet France Prešeren, was born in 1816. The composer Gustav Mahler lived in the house from 1881 to 1882, when he worked as a conductor at the Carniolan Provincial Theatre at Congress Square.
