= Academia Operosorum Labacensium =

Coordinates: 46°3′3.26″N 14°30′27.62″E

The Academia Operosorum Labacensium (Academy of the Industrious Residents of Ljubljana) is a forerunner of the modern Slovenian Academy of Sciences and Arts. It was founded in Ljubljana in 1693 as an association of 23 scholars. Most of the members, which included 13 lawyers, six theologians, and four medical doctors, were ethnically Slovene. The newly founded library became an important centre of activity for its members. The Operosi were very influential in the development of the arts in Ljubljana and throughout the Slovene cultural area.

The members of the academy adopted the Latin name apes (bees) and the academic tag Nobis atque aliis – operosi. Every year they held an annual meeting, as well as four other academic meetings, where they discussed their research. Its purpose from the beginning was to promote scholarship in law, medicine, philosophy, and theology.

In 1701, the academy merged with the Academia incoltorum (Academy of Fine Arts) and Academia philharmonicorum (Academy of Music). At the time of its greatest activity, around 1714, it was an international association of 42 members from Carniola and the counties of central Austria assembled under the patronage of Bishop Franz Karl von Kaunitz. It fell into decline in the summer of 1725, but was revived in 1781, thanks to the efforts of Slovene Enlightenment figures. It was only active for another 20 years or so and thereafter declined again because the members' outlooks and expectations were too much at variance.

== Presidents ==
- Janez Krstnik Prešeren (1656–1704), the first president of the academy.
- Marko Gerbec, president from 1712 to 1713.
