= Timeline of Ljubljana =

The following is a timeline of the history of the city of Ljubljana, Slovenia.

== Prior to 19th century ==
- 35 BCE - Emona, a Roman castrum (fort), founded by emperor Augustus.
- 400 - Emona besieged by Alaric I.
- 451 - Emona desolated by the Huns.
- 900 - Laibach suffered from the Magyars.
- 11th C. - Construction of Ljubljana Castle probably started.
- 12th C. - Duchy of Carinthia in power.
- 1270 – Ottokar II of Bohemia in power.
- 1277 – Habsburgs in power.
- 1335 – Town becomes capital of Carniola, province of the Holy Roman Empire.
- 1370 – St. Bartholomew's Church first mentioned.
- 1461 – Roman Catholic diocese of Laibach established.
- 1484 – Town Hall built.
- 1504 – Janez Lantheri becomes first elected mayor.
- 1511 – 1511 Idrija earthquake.
- 1536 – Protestant Latin school established.
- 1599 – Jesuit school established.
- 1622 – 5 May: 1622 Slovenia earthquake.
- 1658 – Auersperg Palace, Ljubljana built.
- 1660 – Franciscan Church of the Annunciation built.
- 1693 – Academia Operosorum Labacensium founded.
- 1701 – Academia Philharmonicorum Labacensis founded.
- 1703 – Tivoli Castle built.
- 1707 – St. Nicholas's Cathedral rebuilt.
- 1719 – Town Hall, Baroque renovation completed
- 1747 – Visitation of Mary Church built.
- 1751 – Robba Fountain installed in the Town Square.
- 1755 – Cekin Mansion built.
- 1767 – Society of Agriculture and the Useful Arts in the Duchy of Carniola founded.
- 1777 – Gruber Palace built.
- 1778 – Laibacher Zeitung German-language newspaper begins publication.
- 1780 – Gruber Canal constructed (approximate date).
- 1797 – Town occupied by French forces.

== 19th century ==
- 1809 – Town occupied by French forces again.
- 1810 – Botanical Garden established.
- 1813 – French occupation ends.
- 1816 - Laibach was the capital of the Kingdom of Illyria (to 1849).
- 1821
  - January–May: International Congress of Laibach held in Laibach.
  - Congress Square laid out.
  - Estate Museum of Carniola founded.
- 1837 – Casino Building constructed.
- 1842 – Franz's Bridge built.
- 1848 – Railway station built.
- 1849 – Vienna-Laibach railroad begins operating.

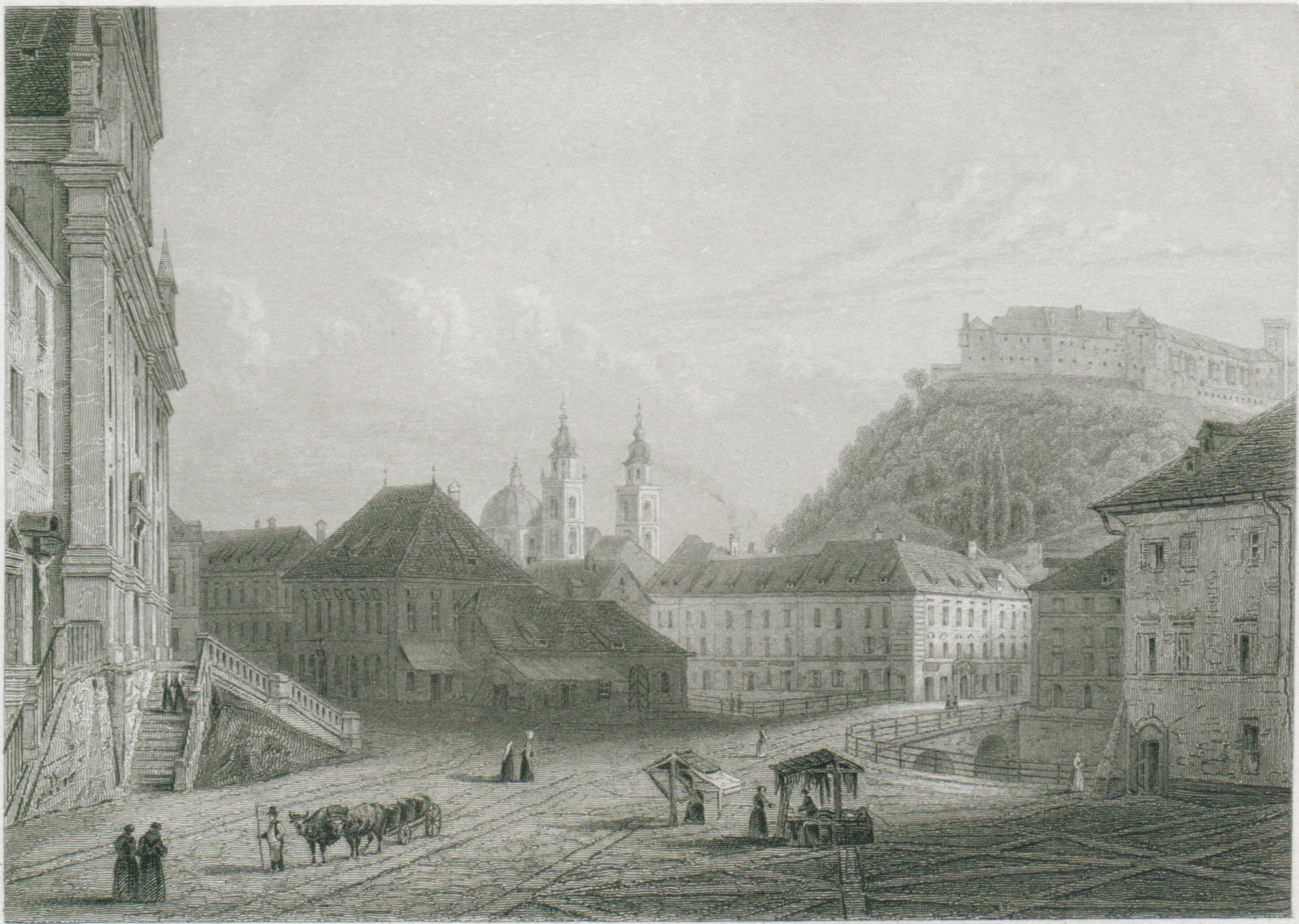
Ljubljana in 1856

- 1857 – Trieste-Laibach railway built.
- 1861 – Gas lighting installed.
- 1867 – Hradecky Bridge built.
- 1869 – Population: 22,593.
- 1871 – Tobačna Ljubljana (tobacco factory) begins operating.
- 1889 – Vodnik statue erected in Vodnik Square.
- 1890
  - Waterworks introduced.
  - Population: 30,691.
- 1892 – Provincial Theatre built.
- 1895 – 14 April: Earthquake.
- 1897 – Central Pharmacy built.
- 1898 – Kresija Palace built.
- 1899 – Government Palace built.
- 1900 - Population: 36,547.

== 20th century ==
- 1901
  - Tram begins operating.
  - Dragon Bridge built.
- 1903 – Jek Bridge rebuilt.
- 1905
  - Grand Hotel Union built.
  - Prešeren Monument erected on Prešeren Square.
- 1907 – Mladika built.
- 1908 – Slovene Philharmonic Orchestra active.

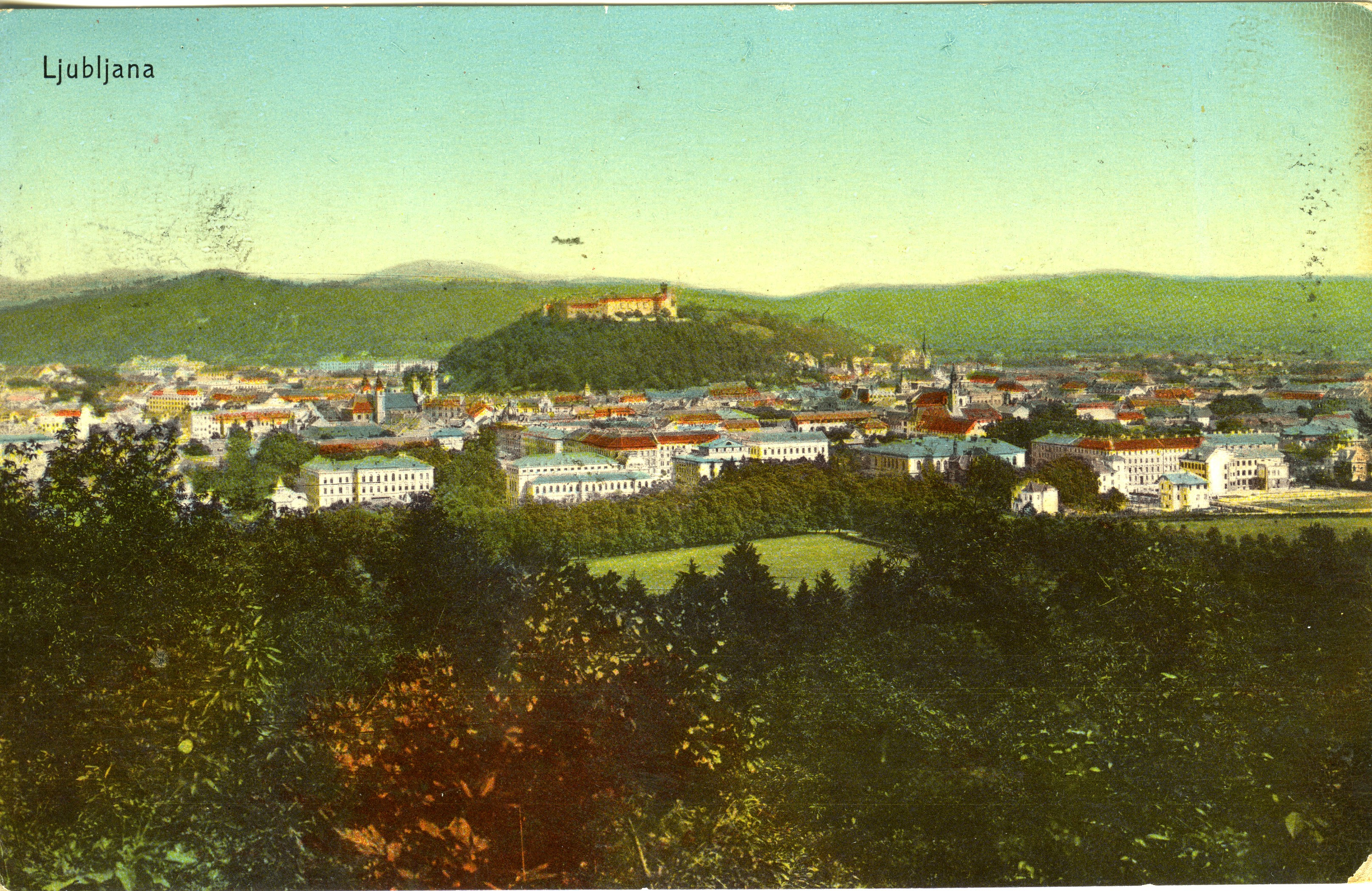
Ljubljana in 1910

- 1911 – Theatre built on Erjavec Street.
- 1918
  - City becomes part of the newly established Kingdom of Serbs, Croats and Slovenes.
  - National Gallery of Slovenia founded.
  - St. Peter's Bridge rebuilt.
- 1919
  - University of Ljubljana and Ljubljana Music Conservatory founded.
  - Ljubljana National Drama Theatre in use.
  - Population: 60,000.
- 1923 – Palace Theatre built.
- 1930 – July: Honorary Consulate of Poland opened.
- 1933 – Nebotičnik hi-rise built.
- 1935 – City Museum of Ljubljana established.
- 1937 – Hotel Slon on Čop Street rebuilt.
- 1938 – Academy of Sciences and Arts founded.
- 1939
  - Ljubljana Central Market built.
  - Academy of Music active.
- 1941
  - April: City annexed by Italy.
  - April: Honorary Consulate of Poland closed.
  - National and University Library of Slovenia building constructed.
- 1942 – "Occupiers surrounded Ljubljana with a 30-kilometre barb wire fence."
- 1943 – German occupation begins.
- 1945
  - Occupation ends.
  - Academy of Theatre established.
  - Ljubljanica Sluice Gate built.
- 1951
  - Ljubljana trolleybus begins operating.
  - Dnevnik newspaper begins publication.
- 1953 – Population: 138,211.
- 1955 – Biennial of Graphic Arts (Ljubljana) begins.

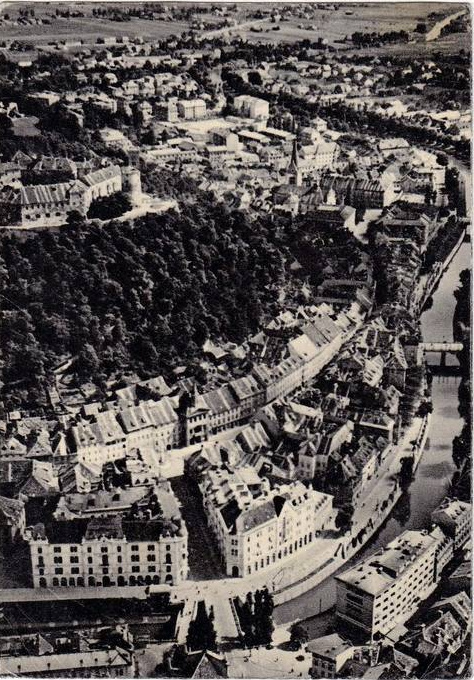
Ljubljana in 1958

- 1959 – Exhibition and Convention Centre (Ljubljana) built.
- 1965
  - Tivoli Hall (arena) opens in Tivoli City Park.
  - SKB bank established.^{(sl)}
- 1966 – OHO (art group) formed.
- 1971
  - City bus service no. 1 (Ljubljana) begins operating.
  - Population: 173,853 city; 213,298 urban agglomeration.
- 1975 - Ljubljana University Medical Centre opened.
- 1982 – Cankar Hall built.
- 1984 – Druga godba music festival begins.
- 1985 – Trail of Remembrance and Comradeship created.
- 1990 – Ljubljana International Film Festival begins.
- 1991
  - 25 June: Ljubljana designated capital of newly declared independent Slovenia.
  - 27 June: Airport bombed by Yugoslav People's Army.
  - Slovenske novice newspaper begins publication.
- 1993 – Prule Bridge built.
- 1999 – General Maister Monument (Brdar) erected.

== 21st century ==
- 2001
  - Noisefest begins.
  - Kolosej Ljubljana cinema opens.
- 2004 – May: Slovenia becomes part of the European Union.
- 2005
  - 31 October: SKB bank robbery occurs.^{(sl)}
  - November: Economic protest.
- 2006
  - Filofest of student films begins.
  - Zoran Janković becomes mayor.
- 2010 – City named World Book Capital by UNESCO.
- 2011 – "Tito Street" issue decided.
- 2012 – November: Anti-austerity 2012–13 Slovenian protests begin.
- 2014 – Population: 277,554.

== See also ==
- Ljubljana history
- Timeline of Ljubljana (in Slovenian)
- Other names of Ljubljana, e.g. Laibach, Laybach, Lubiana
- List of mayors of Ljubljana
- Timeline of Slovenian history

== Bibliography ==
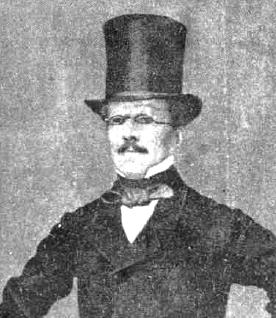
Portrait of Heinrich Costa, Slovene historian, 19th c.

=== in English ===
- George Henry Townsend (1877), "Laybach, Austria", Manual of Dates (5th ed.), London: Frederick Warne & Co., hdl:2027/wu.89097349427
- David Kay (1880), "Provinces and Principal Towns: Carniola: Laibach", Austria-Hungary, Foreign Countries and British Colonies, London: Sampson Low, Marston, Searle, & Rivington, hdl:2027/mdp.39015030647005
- "Laibach". Chambers's Encyclopaedia. London. 1901. hdl:2027/uc2.ark:/13960/t7zk5ms79.
- "Laibach". Handbook for Travellers in South Germany and Austria (15th ed.). London: J. Murray. 1903.
- Phillips, Walter Alison (1910). "Laibach" . Encyclopædia Britannica. Vol. 16 (11th ed.). pp. 82–83.
- Benjamin Vincent (1910), "Laybach, Illyria", Haydn's Dictionary of Dates (25th ed.), London: Ward, Lock & Co., hdl:2027/loc.ark:/13960/t89g6g776
- "Laibach", Austria-Hungary (11th ed.), Leipzig: Karl Baedeker, 1911
- Jörg Stabenow (2009). "Ljubljana". In Emily Gunzburger Makas; Tanja Damljanovic Conley (eds.). Capital Cities in the Aftermath of Empires: Planning in Central and Southeastern Europe. Routledge. pp. 223–240. ISBN 978-1-135-16725-7.
- Brčič Železnik, Branka (2017). "Water Supply of Ljubljana". 44th Annual Congress of the IAH "Groundwater Heritage and Sustainability": Excursion Guidebook. Zagreb: Hrvatski geološki institut (published September 2017). ISBN 978-953-6907-68-7.

=== in other languages ===
- Heinrich Costa [in Slovenian] (1848). "Laibach". Reiseerinnerungen aus Krain [Travels in Carniola] (in German). Ljubljana: Eger.
- "Laibach". Brockhaus' Konversations-Lexikon (in German). Vol. 10 (14th ed.). Leipzig: Brockhaus. 1908. hdl:2027/njp.32101064064569.
