= Grand Hotel Union =

Hotel in Ljubljana, Slovenia

Coordinates: 46°3′8.89″N 14°30′22.29″E

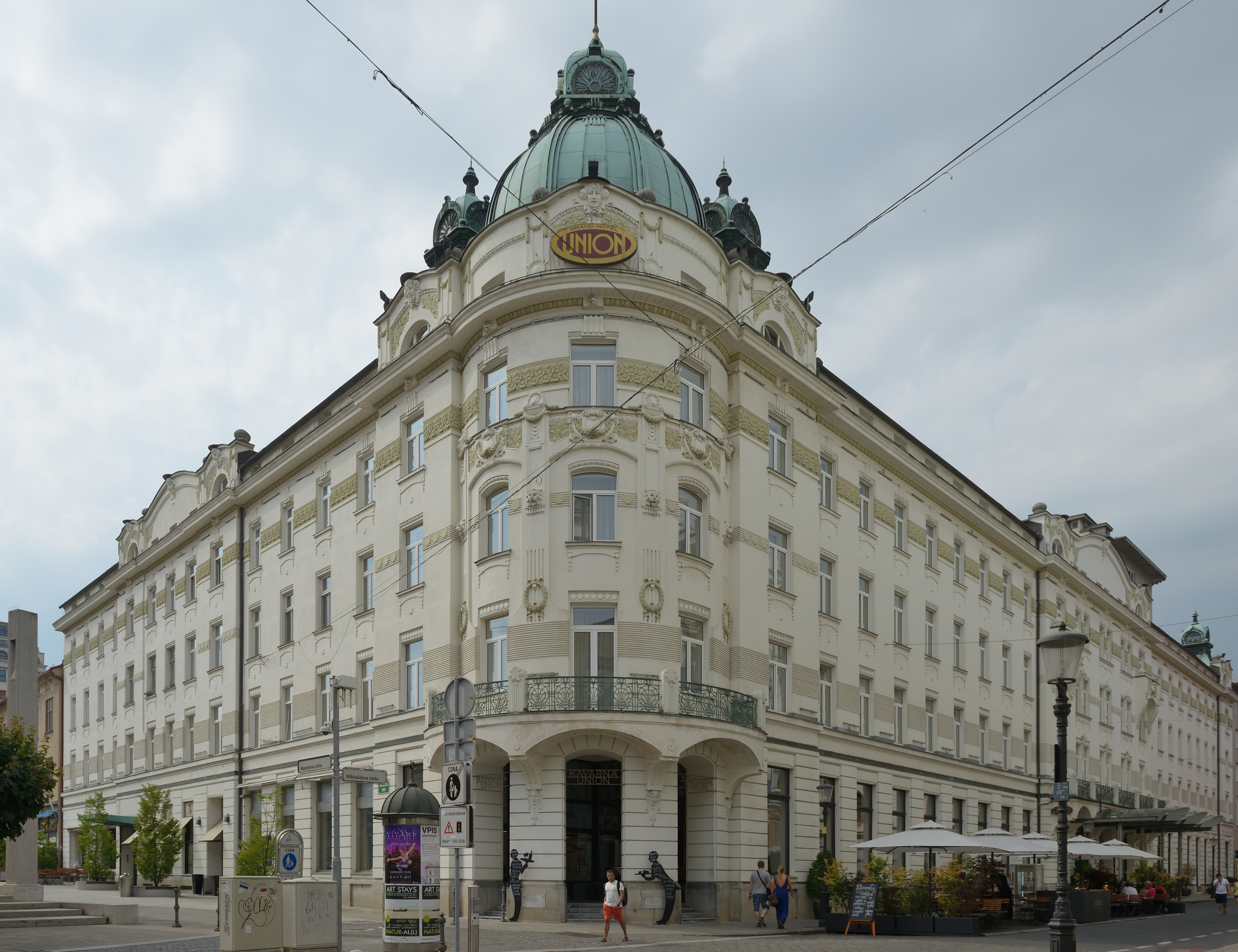
The Grand Hotel Union seen from Miklosich Street. The Franciscan Church of the Annunciation to the left.

The Grand Hotel Union (Slovene: Grand hotel Union) is a four-star hotel near the centre of the city of Ljubljana, the capital of Slovenia.

Built about a block from the city's central Prešeren Square between 1903 and 1905, it is notable for having been Ljubljana's first modern hotel, as well as the city's largest building for a few years after its construction.

The hotel was part of a programme of urban reconstruction during the administration of Mayor Ivan Hribar, initiated in the aftermath of the major 1895 earthquake that destroyed much of Ljubljana's medieval structures. Designed by the architect Josip Vancaš, it is a fine example of the Vienna Secession style. Its façade is almost 100 metres long, and its complex iron roof structure was considered a technical achievement at the time. Since its completion in 1905, the hotel has been redecorated twice, but retains its original style.

The ground floor of the building contains the Café Union (Unionska kavarna).
