= 2020–2022 Slovenian protests =

Slovenian protests
- Date: 28 February 2020 – 22 April 2022
- Location: Slovenia: Ljubljana; Maribor; Celje; Piran; Velenje; Izola
- Caused by: Opposition to the third Janša cabinet
- Goals: Resignation of Janez Janša's government; Snap election
- Methods: Rallies; Non-violent direct action; Civil disobedience
- Result: Snap election: Janez Janša's Party finishes second in the election

Parties
People's Protest Assembly; Unaffiliated protesters	Government of Slovenia; Government supporters (Yellow vests); Slovene National Police

Lead figures
None	Janez Janša

Shortly after the third Janša government took office in early 2020, a series of large, mostly-peaceful protests were held. The start of the protests coincided with the beginning of the COVID-19 pandemic in Slovenia, with temporary restriction of movement and public gatherings in force to curb the spread of the disease. Early protests included the display of flags and banners from balconies and windows. At the end of April, public rallies began to be organised; most protesters bicycled, since recreational movement was permitted in public places. Between April 2020 and April 2022, when a scheduled parliamentary election was held, there were 105 protest rallies organised each Friday by a coalition of non-governmental organisations and civil groups called "People's Protest Assembly" (Protestna ljudska skupščina). Besides the periodic Friday protests, there were occasional demonstrations called for by other groups, including protests against anti-Covid measures and pro-government rallies; notably, on 5 November 2020, protests organized by groups not associated with the regular protests led to riots. Several systemic and operative flaws were identified in the Police handling of the protests, including excessive use of force.

== Background ==
Janez Janša had been accused of eroding media freedom since he took office. According to a report by the International Press Institute, Slovenia has experienced a swift downturn in media and press freedom. The IPI accused Janša of creating a hostile environment for journalists through his tweets, which the institute called "vitriolic attacks". He has also been accused of corruption and usurping power, and his authoritarianism is often compared to that of Viktor Orbán.

== Timeline ==
=== 2020 ===
==== March ====
After the formation of the 14th government of Slovenia, Slovenians began displaying flags and banners on the balconies and windows. Street protests were not yet organized because of the COVID-19 pandemic.

==== April ====
The first street protests occurred in Ljubljana, Maribor, and a few smaller cities on 27 April. They were organized by the Resistance to the Government of Slovenia Facebook group.

==== May ====
On 1 May, around 3,500 cyclists held a peaceful protest in Ljubljana. A week later, about 7,000 cyclists protested in front of the National Assembly Building. Former prime minister Marjan Šarec expressed his sympathy with the protestors.

During the night of 14 May, police placed a fence in front of the National Assembly Building. The following day, protestors jumped over the fence and wrote "our property" inside the fenced area. The Youth for Climate Justice environmental group participated in the day's protests, in which one person was arrested.

On 22 May, another protest was held in front of the National Assembly Building. Like the 14 May protests, environmental groups participated.

A week later, protestors turned their backs on the National Assembly Building and stood in silence for two minutes. Several, including theatrical director Jaša Jenull, were fined for writing with chalk on the sidewalk. The size of this protest has been disputed; police estimated that about 5,000 people gathered, but other sources said that as many as 10,000 were in attendance.

==== June ====
On 5 June, after many protestors wrote with chalk on the sidewalk (as in the 29 May protest), police abandoned their plan to fine protestors for the act. A week later, protestors threw paper plane at police officers who were guarding the fenced area in front of the National Assembly Building. The paper planes contained the phrase "Death to Janšism, freedom to everyone," citing the anti-Axis resistance slogan, and the slogan was chanted by some of the protestors. Around 8:00 pm, police clashed with protestors who were trying to remove the fence in front of the National Assembly Building. A group of protestors jumped over the fence, but were stopped before reaching the building; seven people were arrested and fined. Among those who jumped the fence was artist Jaša Mrevlje Pollak, who was arrested and held in a police van for 30 minutes before being released with no charges.

On 19 June, peaceful protests were held in Ljubljana, Maribor and Celje. Protestors called on police to join the protests.

Six days later, on Slovenia's Statehood Day, protestors organized an "alternative celebration" before the official festivities. They were met by about 30 counter-protestors in yellow vests, and police created a corridor between the groups to prevent a confrontation. The counter-protestors called themselves "Yellow Vests," inspired by the French protest movement. Eight counter-protestors were later identified as members of the Slovenian branch of the neo-Nazi group Blood & Honour.

On 26 June, during a series of peaceful protests in Ljubljana, protestors put chains on the hands of the statue of France Prešeren. The symbolic move declared that civil liberty in Slovenia was declining under the new government.

==== July ====
On 3 July, pro-government counter-protestors again appeared at a peaceful protest in Ljubljana. Nearly 100 organizations condemned the counter-protestors, whose representatives told the media that they aimed to prevent a coup.

A week later, the National Assembly Building was not fenced but there was a large police presence. On 17 July, a "people's assembly" clarified the protestors' demands. A week later, protestors gathered early to support women's rights and the Me Too movement. The people's assembly continued to formulate demands for the country's future.

On 31 July, protestors made a giant puppet of Janez Janša. The people's assembly formulated 245 proposals, ideas and demands for changes in education, health, election law, workers' rights and environmental protection.

==== August ====
On 7 August, protests began in the coastal town of Izola after a report that the town had paid for two hotel rooms for Agriculture Minister Aleksandra Pivec. Protests continued in Ljubljana. A week later, protests were significantly smaller due to heavy rain. The government announced that it would increase military spending, which protestors called "theft".

On 21 August, another peaceful protest was held in Ljubljana. In speeches, protestors talked about the rise of authoritarianism in Slovenia. A week later, protestors focused on environmental issues in front of the National Assembly and Ministry of Environment buildings.

==== September ====
On 4 September, peaceful protestors called for the resignation of the government and encouraged those encountering corruption at work to become whistleblowers. One week later, a flame of protest was lit to symbolise the resistance. Speakers criticized opposition parties for moving towards Janšism, asking opposition leaders what they would do to change the government and promising that silence would be remembered.

Protestors carrying torches surrounded the National Assembly Building on 18 September, chanting "we are the state" and "the streets are ours". Mounted police officers guarded the front and back entrances of the National Assembly Building.

On 25 September, protestors focused on economic issues and tax reforms which would reduce taxes for the wealthy. A large sign reading "Ministry of the Rich" was placed on the entrance of the Ministry of Finance building, and protestors said that privileges for the rich had increased during the COVID-19 pandemic.

==== October ====
On 2 October, a protest took place in front of the Ministry of Health. Protesters called Slovenian public healthcare catastrophic and demanded reform, saying that the government had been privatizing healthcare and facilitating it for the elite.

On 9 October, protestors gathered at Ljubljana's Prešeren Square. Police began identifying them, removing them for violating a decree limiting public gatherings. The police action was called repressive and disgraceful; activist Jaša Jenull said that the protestors were responsible, wearing face masks and socially distancing. Several organizations said that the police used excessive force, and demanded a public apology and explanation. General director of police Andrej Jurič denied the allegations, saying that the police simply maintained public order. Six people were arrested, but were later released without being charged. A week later, police presence was increased and the protests ended without incident.

On 23 October, a handful of protestors (monitored by the police) gathered in spite of bans on travel and public gatherings; police identified 11 people. The Friday street protests were then cancelled due to a wave of COVID-19 infections, and an activist said that people should protest from their homes.

==== November ====
On 5 November, members of the Aware People of Slovenia (Slovene: Osveščeni prebivalci Slovenije, or OPS) and Anonymous Slovenia groups organized a protest. OPS members believe that COVID-19 does not exist; Anonymous Slovenia distanced itself from OPS, its members wearing face masks. The Ljubljana police were reinforced by police from other cities and the national Specialna Enota Policije. OPS members gathered around 5:00 pm, soon attacking the police with torches, stones and explosives; police responded with tear gas and water cannons. At one point, protesters unsuccessfully tried to storm the National Assembly Building. At around 8:00 pm, police began to surround the protestors; Prešeren Square was cleared about 90 minutes later. Fifteen policeman were injured; two protestors were severely injured, and one journalist was injured. The people's assembly said that government attempted to us the riots to link violence to peaceful protestors, and the riots were staged by the government.

=== 2021 protests ===
On 27 April, thousands rallied in Ljubljana to protest against Janez Janša and his increasing authoritarianism and governmental corruption. According to organisers, around 20,000 rallied in the capital. Ten thousand people gathered in Prešeren Square (near the presidential palace) in a 28 May "All Slovenia Uprising" against Janša, demanding new elections.

== Protest groups ==
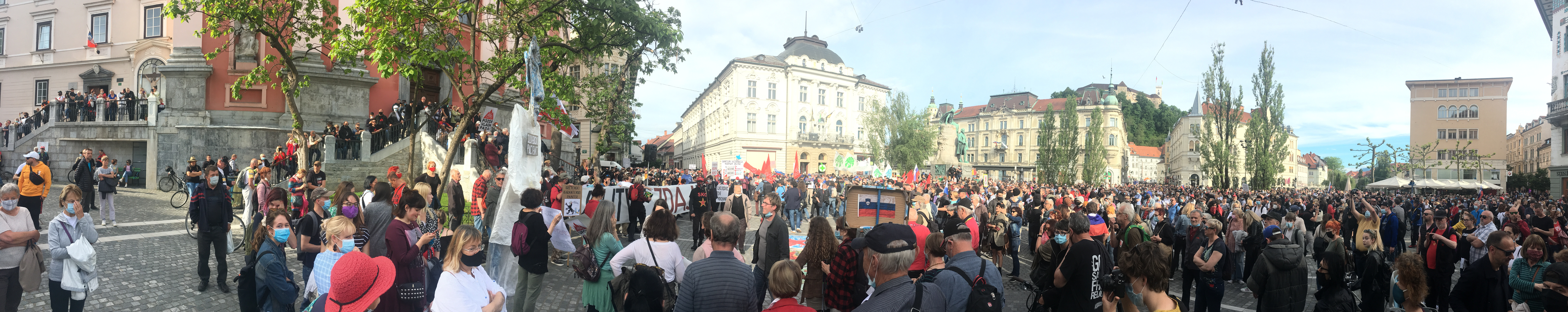

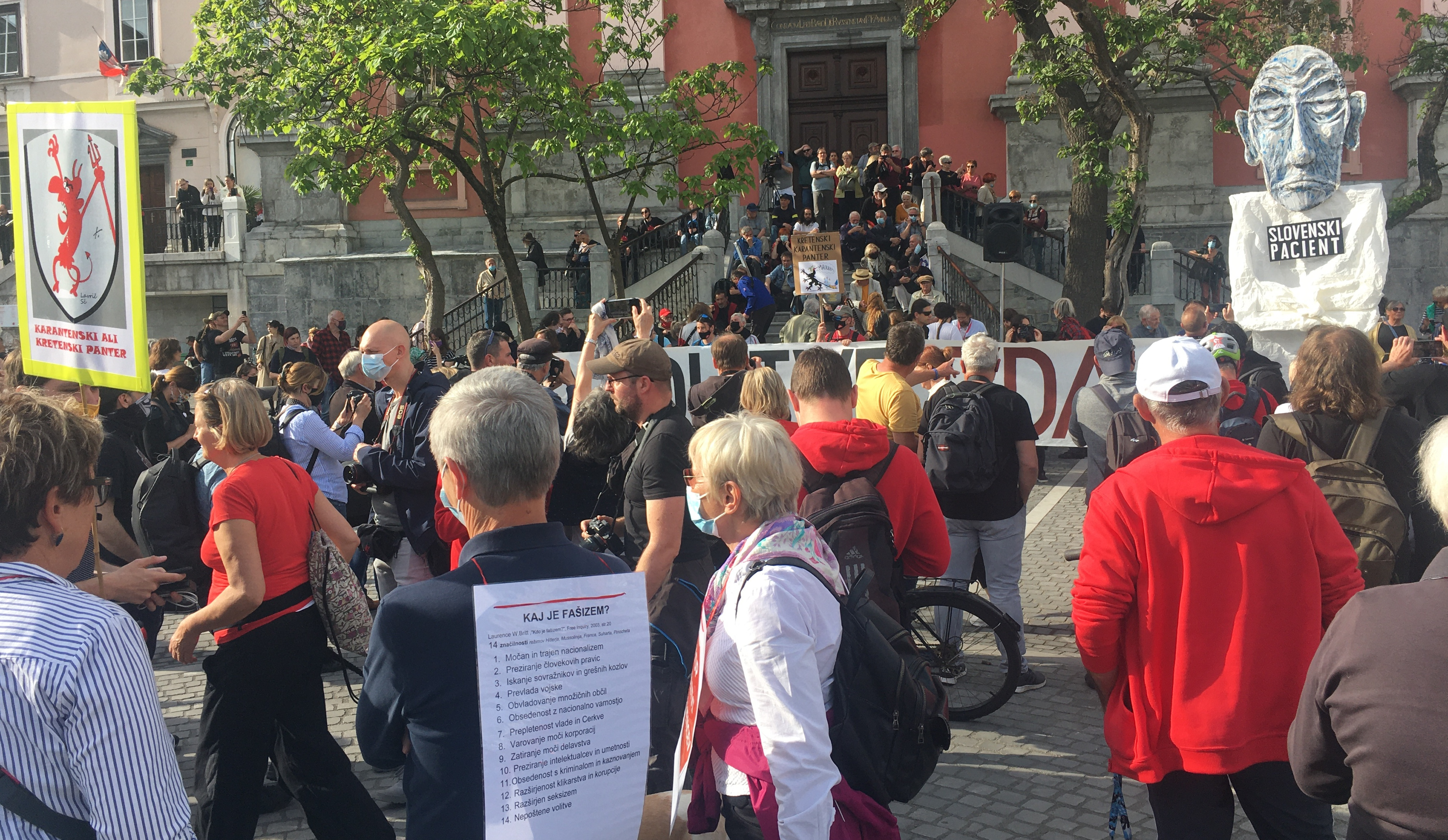
Protests against Janez Janša in Ljubljana, 28 May 2021

Three groups protest against the government, although they do not collaborate and oppose each other: the Friday cyclist protestors, OPS (Aware People of Slovenia) and Anonymous Slovenia.

=== Friday cycling protests ===
The first Friday protest was organized on 27 April 2020 by the Facebook group "Resistance to Government of Slovenia". The peaceful cycling protestors are accompanied by protestors on foot. Protests were held every Friday between 27 April and 23 October 2020, when further protests were cancelled due to the second wave of COVID-19. Organizations participating in the protests included the Youth Activist Organization and Slovenian Antifa. On 17 July, the protestors created a "people's assembly"; by the end of the month, it made 245 demands, proposals and ideas to the government focusing on social, economic, and environmental issues. Theater director and activist Jaša Jenull was the most prominent speaker at the Friday protests. When Anonymous Slovenia announced that it would stage a protest with OPS, the Friday protestors urged people not to participate. Their symbol is a white bicycle sign on a red Triglav symbol.

=== Anonymous Slovenia ===
Anonymous Slovenia group is part of the international Anonymous group. They were first to call for protesters on 5 November 2020, and OPS later announced that they would join them; however, Anonymous Slovenia distanced itself from OPS. At the 5 November protest, they wore Guy Fawkes masks and shouted "thieves" at police in front of the National Assembly building. After the protest, an Anonymous Slovenia spokesperson tweeted: "As we unfortunately expected, certain individuals or groups effectively discredited our protests"; the group insisted that they called for a peaceful protest. After the Friday protestors urged people not to protest on 5 November, an Anonymous Slovenia spokesperson called them "traitors" on Twitter and said that they did not really want Janša out of office.
