= The Baptism on the Savica =

Epic-lyric poem by France Prešeren

The Introduction part of The Baptism on the Savica

The Baptism on the Savica (Slovene: Krst pri Savici) is a long two-part epic-lyric poem written by the Slovene Romantic poet France Prešeren. According to the literary historian Marko Juvan, the work may be considered the Slovene national epic. It is a narration about a hero and the woman he loves in the time of violent Christianisation of the predecessors of the Slovenes.

== Creation and publication ==
The poem was written in the Bohorič alphabet from July 1835 until January 1836 and self-published on 14 April 1836. It was printed in 600 copies in Ljubljana by Josef Blasnik.

== Structure ==
The poem comprises over 500 verses and has three parts. The first part of the poem, added approximately ten years later, is a sonnet dedicating the work to Prešeren's late friend Matija Čop. The second part, the Introduction (Uvod), describes the final battle between Christians and pagan Slavs, led by the hero Črtomir. It is composed of 25 three-line and one four-line stanza and segues directly into the poem's third part, the Baptism (Krst), focusing on the reunion of Črtomir and Bogomila, who had been the priestess of the goddess Živa but is now a Christian. She persuades Črtomir to be baptised too. Part three is composed of 53 ottava rimas. It has less of an epic character than the second, as it mainly focuses on the emotions of individuals. The epics themes include Slovene identity in the context of the nation's conversion to Christianity.

== Depictions ==
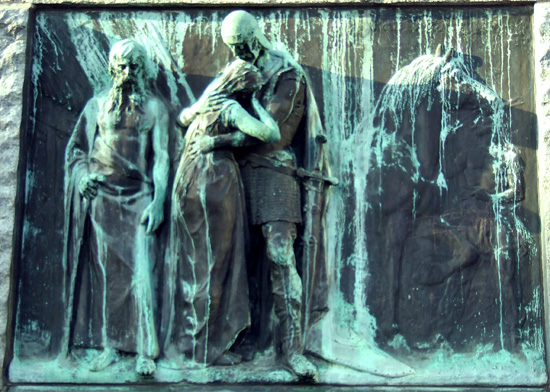
Farewell, relief by Ivan Zajec on the Prešeren Monument in Ljubljana

A motif from the poem is depicted in the bronze relief on the right side of the pedestal of Prešeren Monument at Prešeren Square, the main square in Ljubljana. It is titled Farewell (Slovo) or Črtomir and Bogomila (Črtomir in Bogomila). It was created by the sculptor Ivan Zajec in 1901. It has a Classicist composition, a Realist cadre, an impressionist final touch, and emphasises Prešeren's Romantic poetry with its content.

== Musical arrangements ==
- The Croatian composer Božidar Širola (1889–1956) used the poem for the libretto of his cantata The Baptism on the Savica (Croatian: Krštenje na Savici; 1911).
- In 1920, the Slovene composer Slavko Osterc (1895–1941) used motifs from the poem for his symphonic picture The Baptism on the Savica (Krst pri Savici). Performed for the first time on 22 February 1921 in Ptuj by the Maribor Military Music (Mariborska vojna muzika) orchestra, it was his first piece of work that was presented at a concert. It was also performed by the same orchestra on 22 April in Celje in the support of the construction of the Orthodox church in the town. Until August 1921, he also wrote a Neoromantic opera with the same title, but it was never performed. The libretto was written by Osterc and the Maribor educator Gustav Šilih.
- The poem was used for the major part of the libretto of the chamber opera The Baptism on the Savica, written in 2015 by the Slovene composer Tom Kobe (born 1988). It was staged in collaboration with the George Slatkonia Mixed Choir from Novo Mesto, and premiered with a great success in the city's cultural centre, in November 2015.
