= Mladika Complex =

Slovenian government buildings

Coordinates: 46°3′5.99″N 14°29′53.05″E

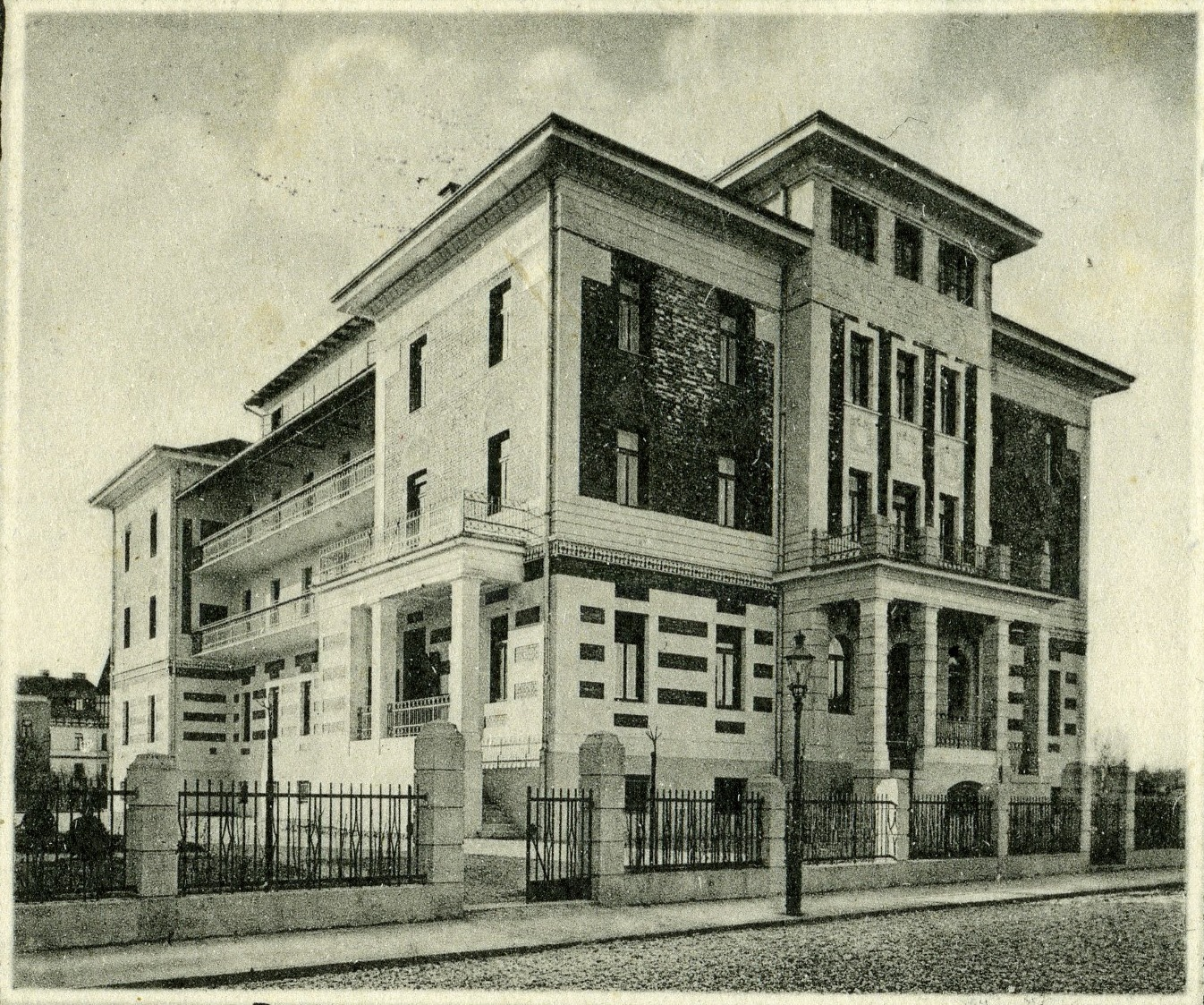

The Mladika Complex, the headquarters of the Ministry of Foreign Affairs of the Republic of Slovenia (Slovene: Ministrstvo za zunanje zadeve), is a complex of two buildings in the Center District of the capital city of Ljubljana. The first building, at the address 25 Prešeren Street (Slovene: Prešernova cesta 25), is L-shaped and stands at the intersection of Prešeren Street and Šubic Street (Šubičeva ulica). The other, at the address 11 Šubic Street, stands at the intersection of Šubic Street and Bleiweis Street (Bleiweisova cesta).

== History ==
The L-shaped building was built in 1906 and 1907 following the Ljubljana earthquake of 1895, as part of a wider plan of urban renovation carried out by the mayor Ivan Hribar, to host the town's girls' lyceum. It was designed by the architect Max Fabiani. In addition, the education society Mladika ("Offspring") from 1907 operated there a private girls' elementary school, which in 1910 was taken over by the town. From 1910 until 1912, the second building was built by Mladika upon the plans by the architect Ciril Metod Koch to host its boarding house, which was operated by the society until 1919.

== Architecture ==
Fabiani's modernist building, based on local architectural tradition, features a white façade with a number of red brick elements. It is adorned with stucco floral motifs and owls, symbolizing wisdom. The building's windows are decorated with steel lintels. The main entrance is surmounted by a clock turret and decorated with a relief of four girls bearing coats-of-arms of the Duchy of Carniola, of the town of Ljubljana and of the businessman Gorup who financed the construction. It was carved by the sculptor Ivan Zajec upon the idea and a sketch by Fabiani and built into the facade in 1910.

Koch's building, closer to the Vienna Secession style, has a rectangular ground plan and also features two contrasting colours. It features stucco floral motifs on the partition wall encircling the building.
