= Argentina Park =

Park in Ljubljana, Slovenia

Coordinates: 46°3′15.8″N 14°30′11.2″E

Argentina Park (Slovene: Argentinski park) is the name of a park in the center of Ljubljana, the capital of Slovenia. Formerly known as Lenin Park, it was renamed in the 1990s to commemorate the friendly relations between Argentina and Slovenia. A part of the park was renamed Park slovenske reformacije (Slovene Reformation Park) in 2000.
