= Ljubljanica Sluice Gate =

Ljubljanica Sluice Gate Zapornica na Ljubljanici
- The Ljubljanica Sluice Gate
- Coordinates: 46°03′00″N 14°31′05″E
- Crosses: Ljubljanica
- Locale: Ljubljana, Slovenia

History
- Architect: Jože Plečnik
- Built: 1943

Location
- Interactive map of Ljubljanica Sluice Gate

The Ljubljanica Sluice Gate (Slovene: Zapornica na Ljubljanici), or the Partition (Pregrada), is a sluice gate and a triumphal arch on the Ljubljanica River in Ljubljana, the capital of Slovenia. It is located between Cukrarna (a former sugar factory) and Vraz Square (Vrazov trg) in the Center District, east of the Ljubljana old town, a bit downstream of Ambrož Square (Ambrožev trg). It was designed in 1939 by the Slovene architect Jože Plečnik, who envisaged it as a monumental farewell to the Ljubljanica River on its exit from the Ljubljana city centre. It was planned to be used as a footbridge as well. The sluice gate was built with difficulty from 1940 until 1943 by the constructor Matko Curk. Since July 2009, it has been protected as a monument of national significance, along with other major works by Plečnik. Since August 2021, the Ljubljanica Sluice Gate has been inscribed as part of Plečnik's legacy on the UNESCO World Heritage List.
