= Franciscan Church of the Annunciation =

Coordinates: 46°3′6.62″N 14°30′21.61″E

- Cerkev Marijinega oznanjenja
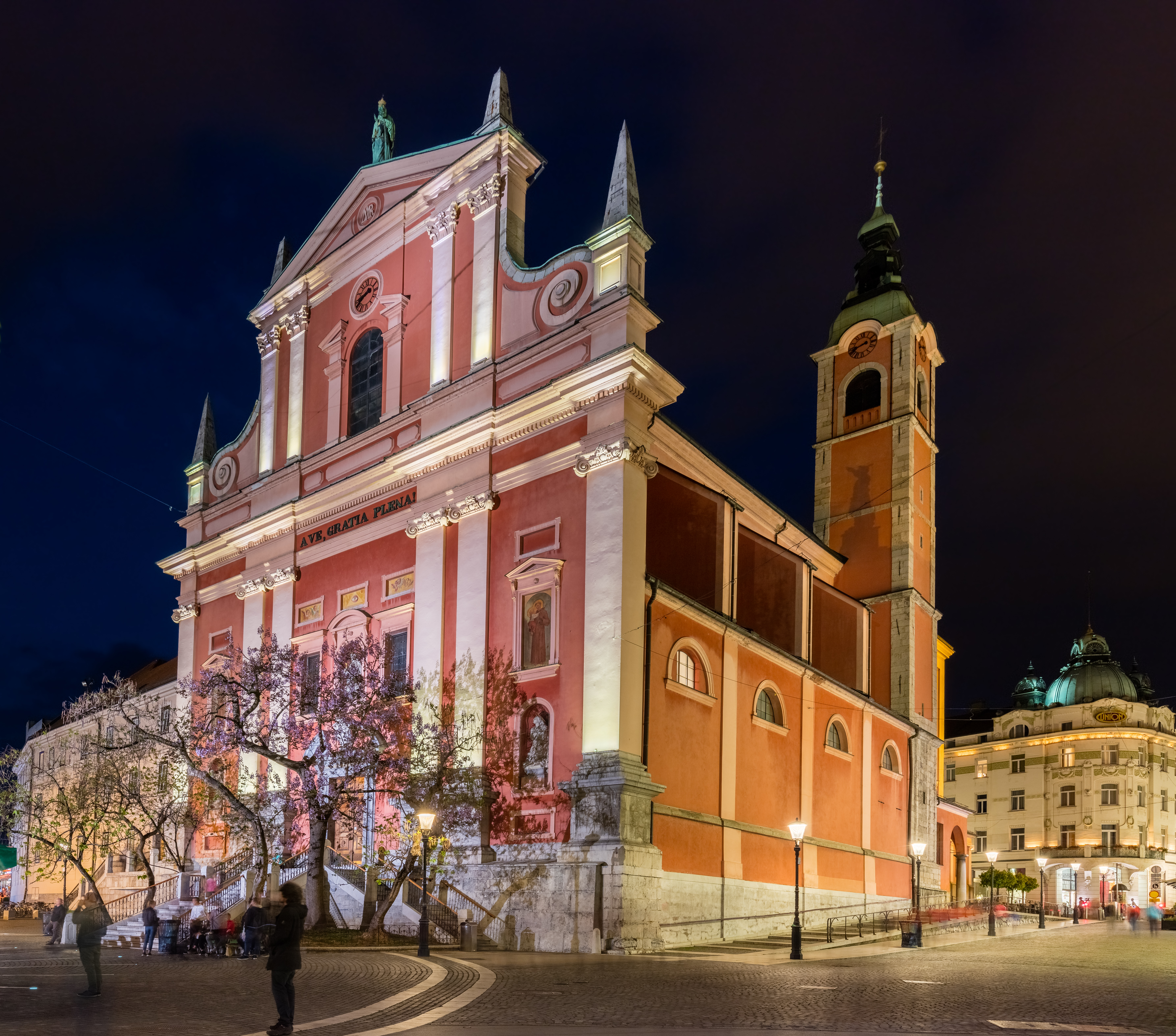
- Franciscan Church of the Annunciation
- Location: Prešeren Square, Ljubljana
- Country: Slovenia
- Denomination: Roman Catholic
- Religious institute: Franciscans

History
- Status: parish church
- Dedication: Annunciation

Architecture
- Functional status: active
- Architect(s): Francesco Olivieri (1646–1655), Francesco Rosina (1655–1660); Franz Goldenstein (1858), Črtomir Mihelj (1992–1993)

Administration
- Archdiocese: Ljubljana
- Deanery: Ljubljana - Center
- Parish: Ljubljana - Annunciation Parish

Clergy
- Pastor: p. Pavle Jakop

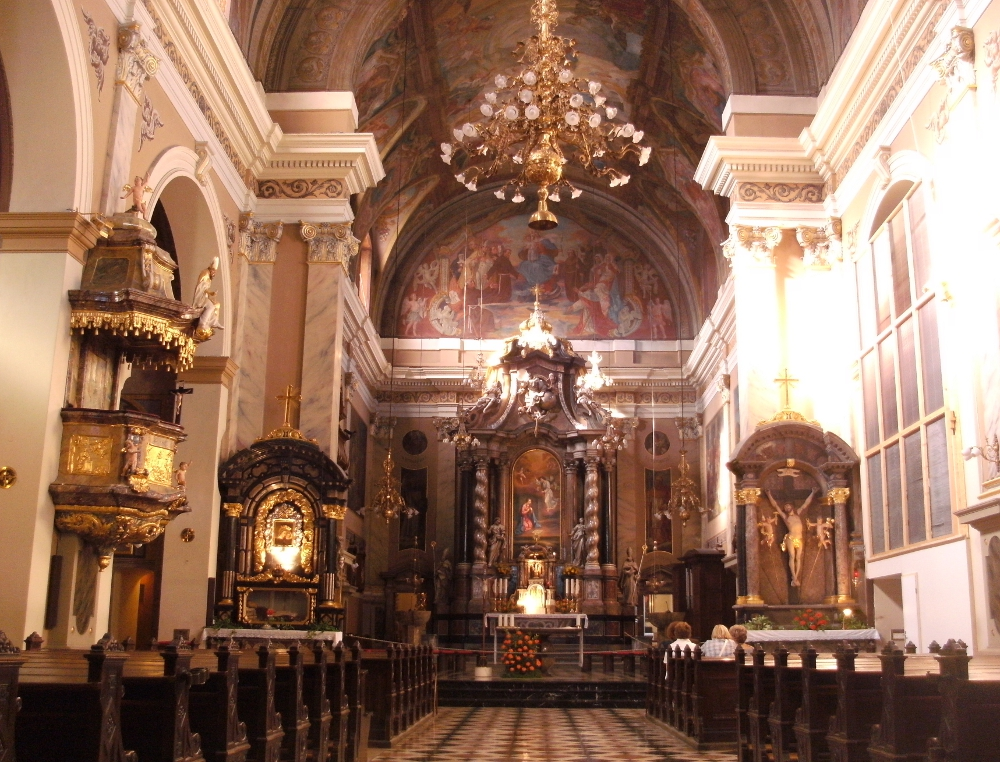
Franciscan Church interior

The Franciscan Church of the Annunciation (Slovene: frančiškanska cerkev Marijinega oznanjenja or commonly frančiškanska cerkev; officially Cerkev Marijinega oznanjenja) is a Franciscan church located on Prešeren Square in Ljubljana, the capital of Slovenia. It is the parish church of Ljubljana - Annunciation Parish. It was built on a site where two or possibly three churches stood earlier between 1646 and 1660 (the bell towers following around 1720) under the management of Francesco Olivieri and Francesco Rosina, and its exterior was redesigned in 1858 according to plans by Franz Kurz zum Thurn und Goldenstein. The frescoes in the interior were added in the mid-19th century by Matevž Langus and on the ceiling by Matej Sternen in the first half of the 20th century, whereas the main altar was mostly made by the Baroque sculptor Francesco Robba (1736). The red or pink colour of the church is symbolic of the Franciscan monastic order. Since 2008, the church has been protected as a cultural monument of national significance of Slovenia.

== Interior ==
The early-Baroque layout takes the form of a basilica with one nave and two rows of side-chapels. The Baroque main altar was executed by the sculptor Francesco Robba. Frescos in the interior were mostly painted by Matevž Langus in 1845 and 1848–55; two of them were contributed by Janez Wolf) in 1882. Many of the original frescoes were ruined by the cracks in the ceiling caused by the Ljubljana earthquake in 1895. New ceiling frescoes were painted in 1935–1936 in the Baroque trompe-l'œil manner by the Slovene otherwise impressionist painter Matej Sternen.

== Façade ==
The front facade of the church was built in the Baroque style in 1703–1706 and completely redesigned in 1858 according to the plans of the Austrian painter Franz Kurz zum Thurn und Goldenstein. Its red colour replaced the earlier classical white, a Goldenstein's fresco of four Church Fathers was added above the entrance (in 1882, it was replaced by a fresco by Janez Wolf), and a statue of Our Lady of Loretto, i.e. Madonna with Child, was added at the top of the facade. The statue, which replaced an older wooden statue of a Black Madonna, was made of beaten copper by Matej Schreiner upon a plan drawn by Goldenstein.

The facade has two parts, featuring pilasters with the Ionic capitals in the lower part and pilasters with Corinthian capitals in the upper part. The sides of the upper part are decorated with volutes. The faces and the hands were modelled by Franc Ksaver Zajec. The facade also has three niches with sculptures of God the Father above the main stone portal, and an angel and the Virgin Mary in the side niches, work by the Baroque sculptor Paolo Callalo. There is a stone entrance staircase in front of the church. The wooden door with reliefs of women's heads dates to the 19th century. In the 20th century, the facade was renovated twice, in 1961 and 1992–93.

== Monastery ==
Next to the church, squeezed next to Prešeren Square between Čop Street, Nazor Street and Miklošič Street, there is a Franciscan monastery dating from the 13th century. It features the richest monastic library in Slovenia, which contains over 70,000 books, including many incunables and medieval manuscripts. Founded in 1233, the monastery was initially located at Vodnik Square, moving to the present location during the Josephine reforms of the late 18th century.
