= Prešeren Monument (Ljubljana) =

Monument to the Slovenian national poet France Prešeren in Ljubljana

Coordinates: 46°3′5.07″N 14°30′22.71″E

- Artist: Statue: Ivan Zajec; Pedestal: concept by Ivan Zajec, design by Max Fabiani, stonemason Alojzij Vodnik
- Type: Sculpture
- Location: Ljubljana

The Prešeren Monument in Ljubljana (Slovene: Prešernov spomenik), also Prešeren Statue in Ljubljana, is a late Historicist bronze statue of the Slovene national poet France Prešeren in Ljubljana, the capital of Slovenia. It stands in the eastern side of Prešeren Square, in front of the Central Pharmacy Building. It is among the best-known Slovenian monuments.

== Statue ==
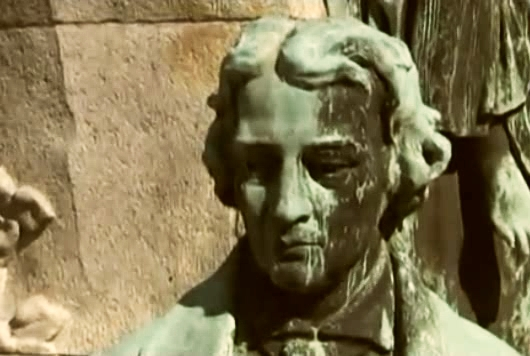
Detail of the statue of Prešeren

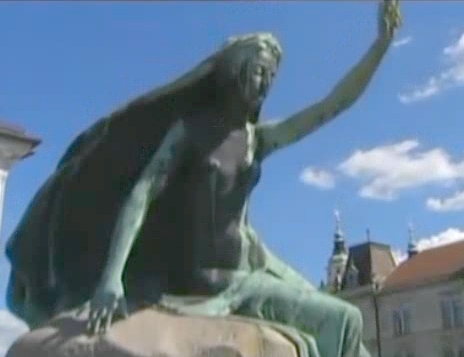
Sculpture of the muse

The statue that stands on a pedestal includes a sculpture of the poet, facing the window where his adored Julija Primic used to live, and a sculpture of a half naked muse above him sitting on a rock and holding a laurel branch in her hand. The poet is dressed in formal attire, wearing a vest and an unbuttoned coat, and holds a book symbolising his Poems (Poezije). The sculpture of Prešeren is 3.5 metres (11 ft) high, and the entire monument is 9.6 metres (31 ft) high. There is a bust of Julija Primic on the building that Prešeren faces, as well.

== Pedestal ==
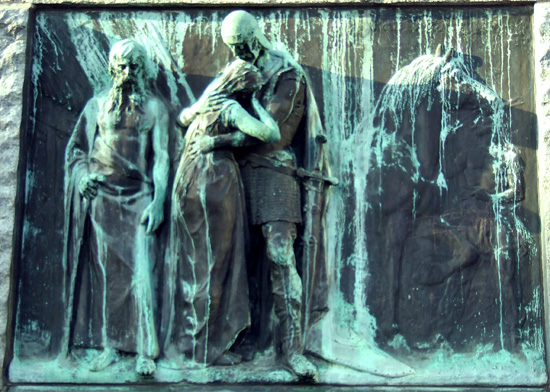
Farewell, relief by Ivan Zajec on the pedestal of the Prešeren Monument

The pedestal of Prešeren's statue is made of Pohorje tonalite and has three steps. Above it, there is a cut rock block with the inscription "Prešeren". The lighter base of the muse is made of Tyrolian granite. It was made by the stonemason Alojzij Vodnik per a design by Max Fabiani, who based his work on a concept by Ivan Zajec. A letter about the erection of the monument and some coins have been built into the pedestal.

There are two bronze reliefs on the lower part of the pedestal, depicting scenes from Prešeren's Poems. The right one, titled Farewell (Slovo) or Črtomir and Bogomila (Črtomir in Bogomila), depicts a scene from the poem The Baptism on the Savica. The left one, titled Fisherman (Ribič), depicts a scene from the poem Fisherman. The reliefs on the pedestal were created by Zajec in 1901. They have a Classicist composition, a Realist cadre, an impressionist final touch, and emphasise Prešeren's Romantic poetry with its content. The upper part of the pedestal is decorated with a stylised lime tree, reminding of the poet's homeland's symbol.

== History ==
=== Creation and unveiling ===
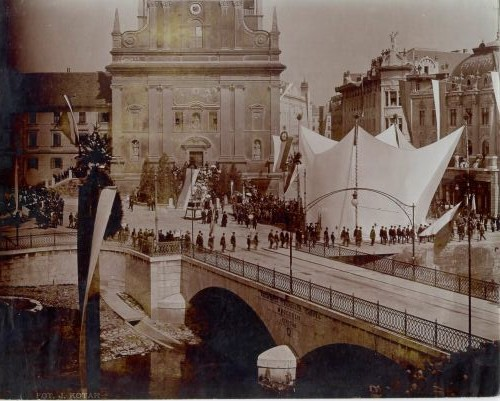
Celebration ahead of the unveiling of the monument

The idea for the Prešeren monument was first proposed by a group of grammar school students in 1889. In 1891, it was supported by 52 Slovene scholars, and finally, in 1898, by Ljubljana mayor Ivan Hribar. He also organised a board for this purpose. Hribar announced a competition in 1899. Seven sculptors submitted their proposals in time, among them Franc Berneker, Anton Bitežnik, Jakob Žnider, Alojzij Progar, and finally Ivan Zajec, who won it. He received the commission on 18 October 1900.

Zajec started his work in the studio of Hans Makart in Vienna. The model for Prešeren was Prešeren's portrait by Goldenstein, and he depicted the suit of Prešeren after a model from 1830–1840, borrowed in a Vienna museum. The model for the muse was Olimpia Pozatti, a dancer from Trieste. The monument of Prešeren was cast in Krupp foundry in Vienna (Kaiserlich Königliche Kunst-Erzgießerei) in September 1903, and the muse was cast in the beginning of 1904. The costs for the entire monument were around 71,000 kronen, largely raised by Slovene women and various societies.

The monument was ceremonially unveiled on 10 September 1905. Over 20,000 people were present. The ceremonial speech was read by Ivan Tavčar. A biography of Prešeren with some of his poems was published by Engelbert Gangl on the occasion. The naked muse became a bone of contention for some townspeople, especially for bishop Anton Bonaventura Jeglič.
