= Max Fabiani =

Austrian-Italian architect

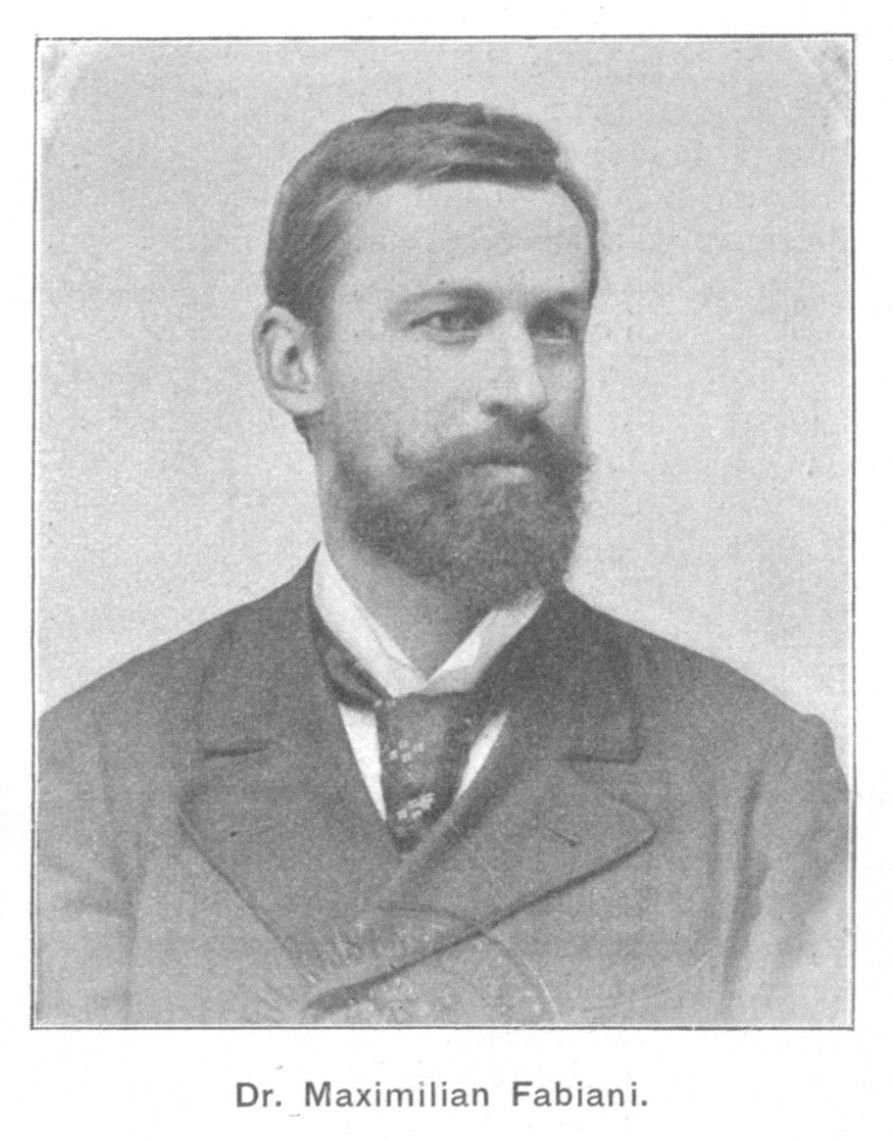
- Fabiani in 1902
- Born: 29 April 1865; Kobdilj, County of Gorizia and Gradisca, Austrian Empire
- Died: 12 August 1962 (aged 97); Gorizia
- Education: Vienna College of Technology
- Occupation: Architect
- Buildings: Urania palace Palace Portois & Fix
- Projects: urban development plan for Ljubljana; Sacred Heart Metropolitan Church, Gorizia

Maximilian Fabiani, commonly known as Max Fabiani (Italian: Massimo, Slovene: Maks) (29 April 1865 – 12 August 1962), was a Slovenian architect born in the village of Kobdilj near Štanjel, Austro-Hungary (in present-day Slovenia). Together with Ciril Metod Koch and Ivan Vancaš, he introduced the Vienna Secession style of architecture (a type of Art Nouveau) in Slovenia.

== Life ==
Fabiani was born to Antonio Fabiani, an Italian latifondist from Paularo of Bergamasque ancestry, and Charlotte von Kofler, a Triestine aristocrat of Tyrolean origin. He grew up in a cosmopolitan trilingual environment: besides Italian, the language of his family, and Slovene, the language of his social environment, he learned German at a very young age.

He came from a wealthy family that could afford to provide a good education for its 14 children. He attended elementary school in Kobdilj, and the German- and Slovene-language Realschule in Ljubljana, where he was the best student in the class after seven years. He later moved to Vienna, where he attended architecture courses at the Vienna University of Technology. After earning his degree in 1889, a scholarship enabled him to travel for three years (1892–1894) to Asia Minor and through most of Europe. He was married and had two children; his son Lorenzo Fabiani (1907–1973) was an agronomist and journalist and known anti-fascist.

In 1917, Fabiani was named professor at the University of Vienna, and in 1919 one of his pupils, Ivan Vurnik, offered him a teaching position at the newly established University of Ljubljana, Fabiani however refused the offer, quit the teaching position in Vienna, and decided to settle in Gorizia, which had been annexed to the Kingdom of Italy, thus becoming an Italian citizen.

On 15 May 1921—less than a year after the burning of the Narodni Dom Slovene Cultural Center in Trieste following the killing of Italian Navy soldiers in Yugoslavia, which he had designed—Fabiani became a member of the Italian fascist movement. The reason why he joined the party and his political activity in the following years remain unclear and controversial.

In late 1935, Fabiani (at age 70) accepted the nomination for mayor (podestà) of his native village of Štanjel. He remained mayor during World War II, using his knowledge of German language and his cultural acquaintances to convince the German troops to spare the village from destruction. Nevertheless, the monumental fortifications part of the village and castle, which he himself had renovated during the 1930s, were eventually destroyed in the fight between the Wehrmacht and the Slovene partisans. His house with its rich archive in Kobdilj was also burnt down.

In 1944, Fabiani relocated to Gorizia, where he lived until his death on 12 August 1962.

A widely circulated but false story regarding Fabiani is that the young Adolf Hitler once briefly worked in his architecture firm in Vienna. The myth is not supported by any sources, and it appears to have been fabricated in 1966.

== Work ==
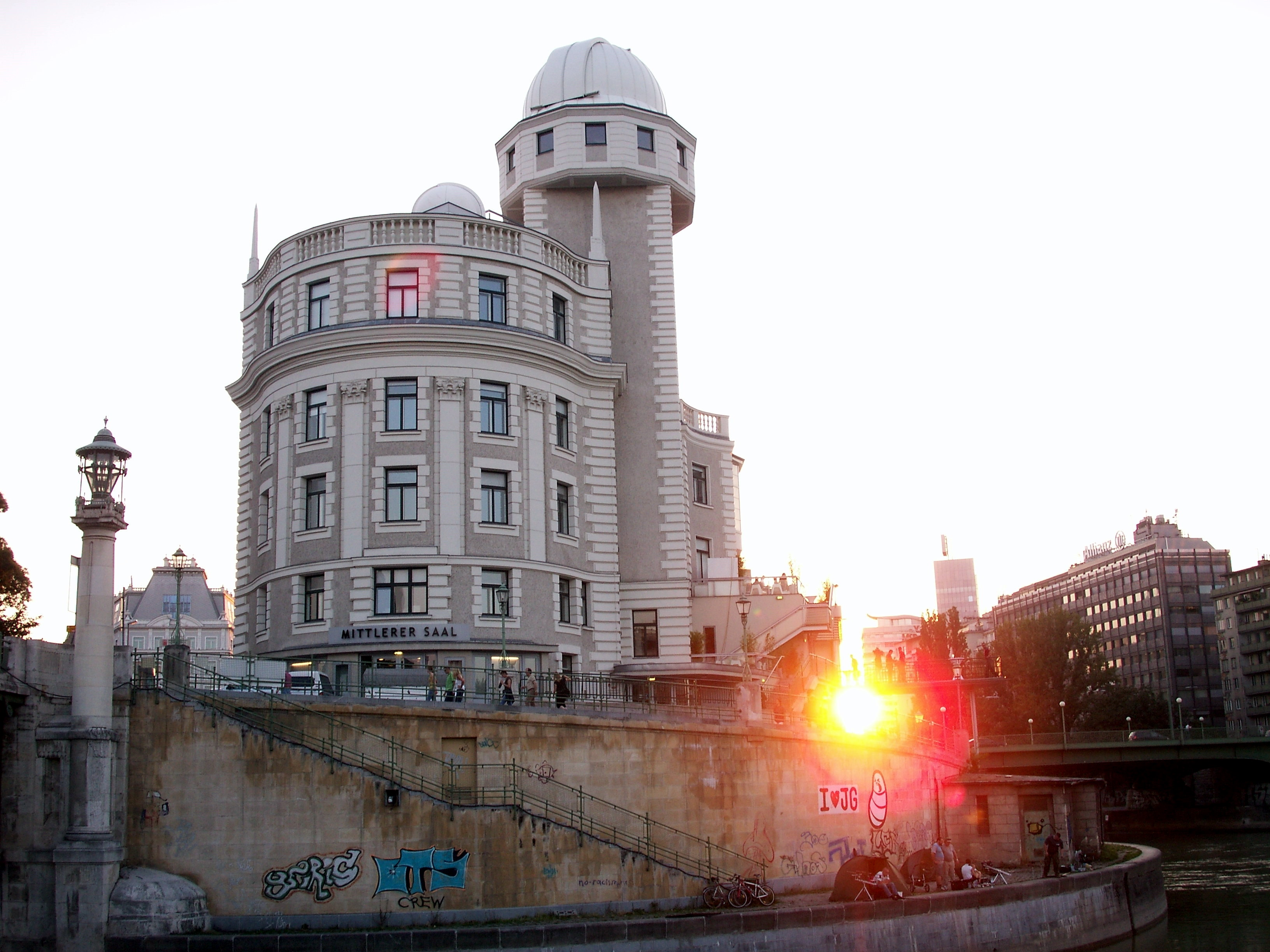
The Urania Palace in Vienna

Upon returning to Vienna, he joined the studio of the architect Otto Wagner at Wagner's personal invitation, and he stayed there until the end of the century. During this period he not only concentrated his interests on design but also cultivated his vocation as town planner and passionately devoted himself to teaching. How much he influenced Wagner's book about architecture is unknown.

Fabiani's first large-scale architectural project was the urban plan for the Carniolan (now Slovenian) capital Ljubljana, which was badly damaged by the April 1895 Ljubljana earthquake. Fabiani won a competition against the more historicist architect Camillo Sitte, and he was chosen by the Ljubljana Town Council as the main urban planner. One of the reasons for this choice was that Fabiani was considered by the Slovene Liberal Nationalists as a Slovene. The second reason was that he knew Ljubljana better than Sitte and prepared a very good and modern plan.

With the personal sponsorship of the liberal nationalist mayor of Ljubljana Ivan Hribar, Fabiani designed several important buildings in the town, including the L-shaped secondary school for girls in the Mladika Complex facing Prešeren Street (Slovene: Prešernova cesta), which is now the seat of the Slovenian Foreign Ministry.

The Ferrari Garden in Štanjel

His work in Ljubljana helped him to become well known in the Slovene Lands, convincing Slovene liberal nationalists in the Austrian Littoral to entrust him with the design for the Slovene cultural centers in Gorizia (1903) and Trieste (1904).

Fabiani also created the urban plan for Bielsko in Poland. In 1902, these two urban plans won him the first honorary doctorate in the field of urban planning by the University of Vienna in Austria-Hungary.

During the 1920s, he coordinated a large scale reconstruction of villages and some historical monuments in the areas in the Julian March that had been devastated by the Battles of the Isonzo during World War I.

== Notable works ==
The most notable works designed by Fabiani include:

- Schlegel Mansion, Opatija, Croatia
- Portois & Fix Palace (Vienna, 1898)
- Artaria Palace, Kohlmarkt (Vienna, 1900)
- Lyceum, Mladika Palace (Ljubljana, 1907)
- Krisper House (Ljubljana, 1901)
- Bamberg House (Ljubljana, 1906)
- Urania Palace (Vienna, 1902)
- Revenue Office building (Gorizia, 1903)
- Slovene Cultural Center (Trieste, 1904)
- Prešeren Square and the Prešeren Monument (Ljubljana, unveiled in 1905)
- Stabile Palace (Trieste, 1906)
- Urban development plan for Ljubljana (1895)
- Wechsler Mansion (Vienna, 1911)
- Saint Germanus's Church (Brijuni, Croatia, 1912)
- Plan for the reconstruction of Gorizia (1921)
- General urban development plan for Venice (1952)
- Restoration of the Gorizia cathedral (Gorizia, 1919)
- General urban development plan of Monfalcone, Italy (1919)
- Bigot Mansion (Gorizia, 1921)
- Pellegrini house in Gorizia (1922)
- Felberbaum house in Gorizia (1925)
- Saint George's Church (Lucinico, 1927)
- Ferrari Garden (Štanjel, 1930–40)
- Sacred Heart Metropolitan Church (Gorizia, 1934)
- Tower of Memory, a memorial to the Italian soldiers that died in World War I (Gorizia, 1937)
- House of Fascism (Casa del Fascio, Štanjel, 1938)

== Awards ==
- Italian Order of Merit for Culture and Art – Rome, 10 September 1951.

== Legacy ==
- In 1984, in Vienna Simmering (11th District), Fabiani Street (German: Fabianistraße) was named after him.
- In 2008, the Slovenian highest award for best achievements in urban planning was named after him.

== Gallery ==
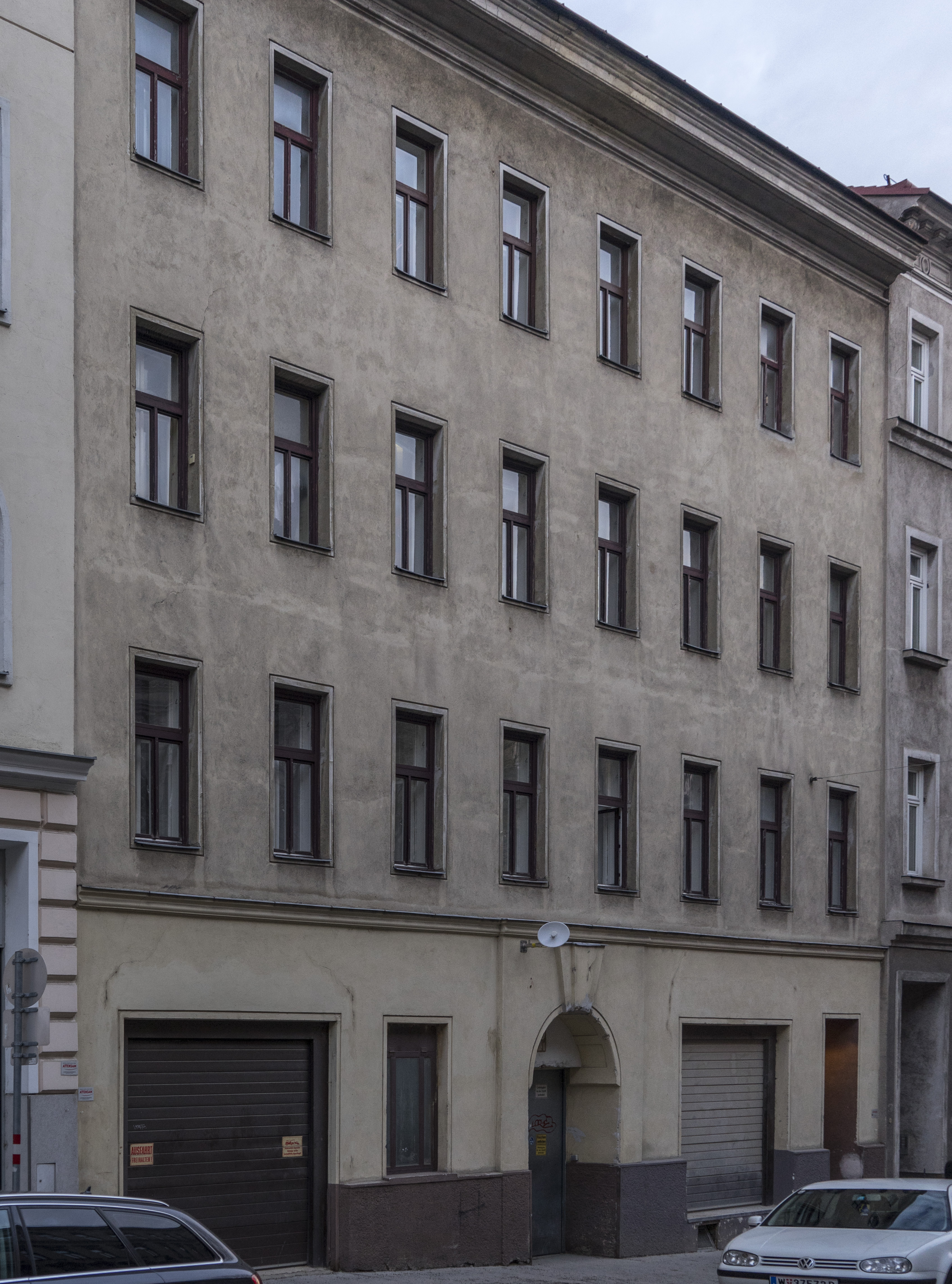
Preysinggasse 10, Vienna (1897)

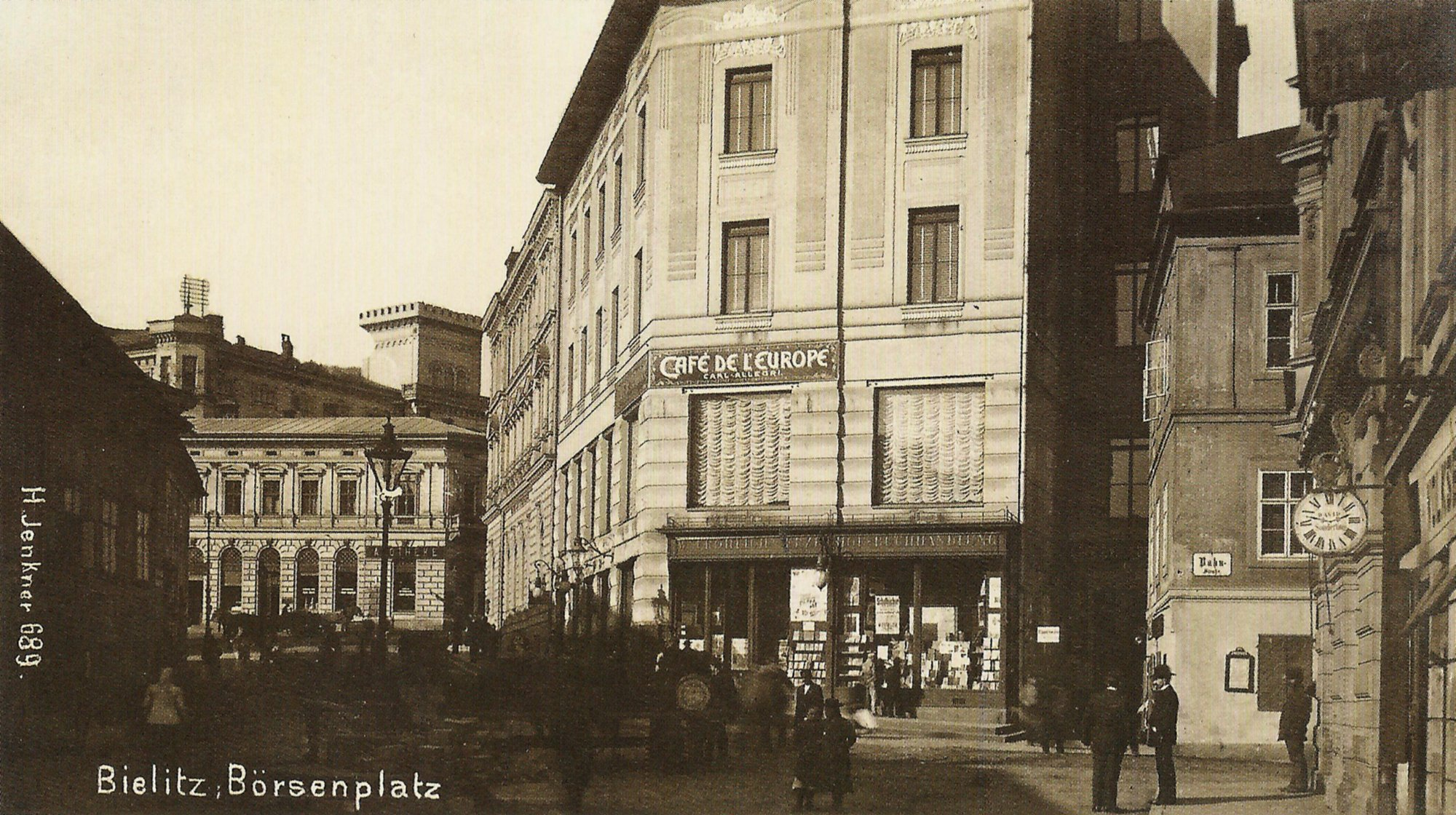
Ulica Barlickiego 1, Poland (1899)

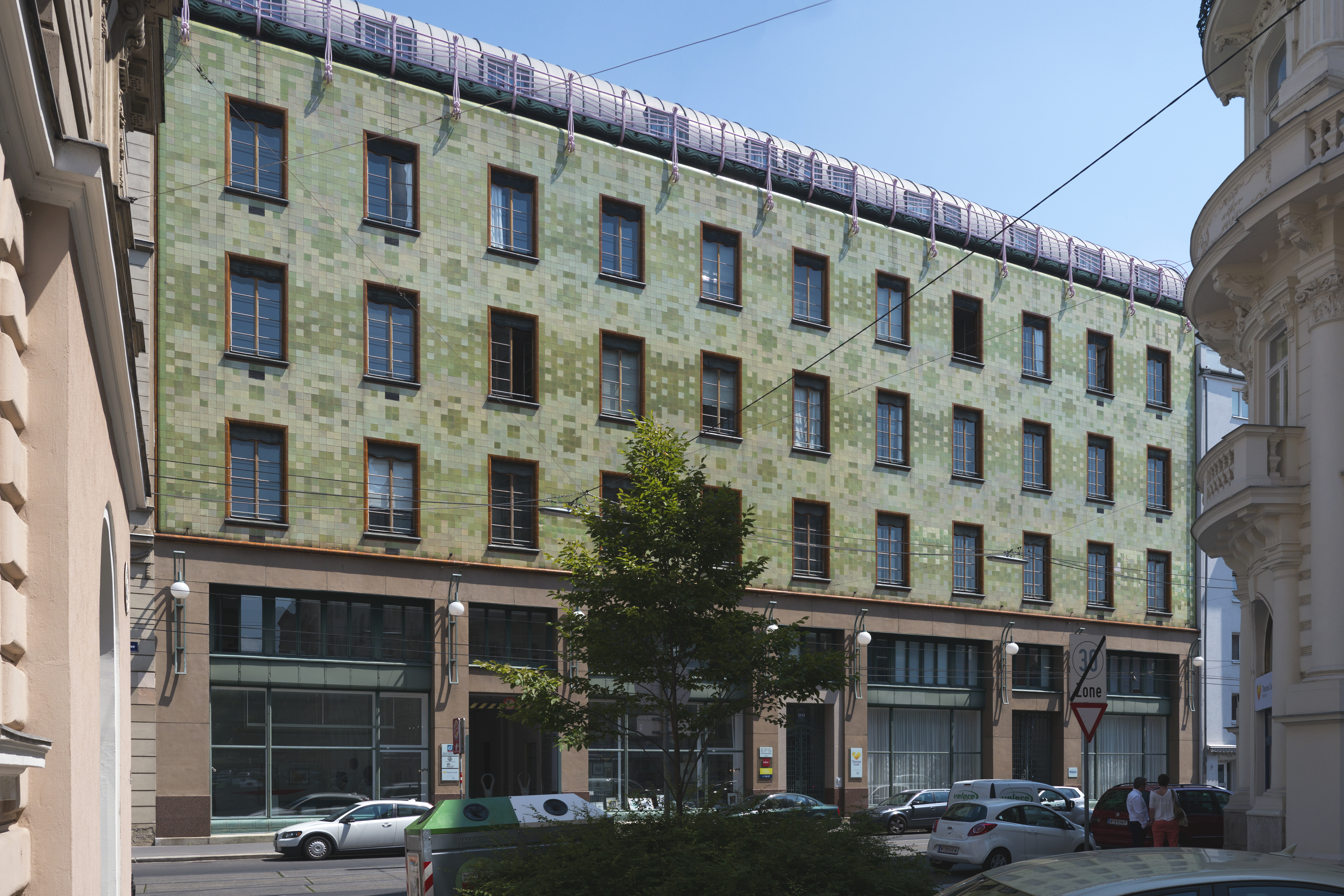
Portois, Vienna (1900)

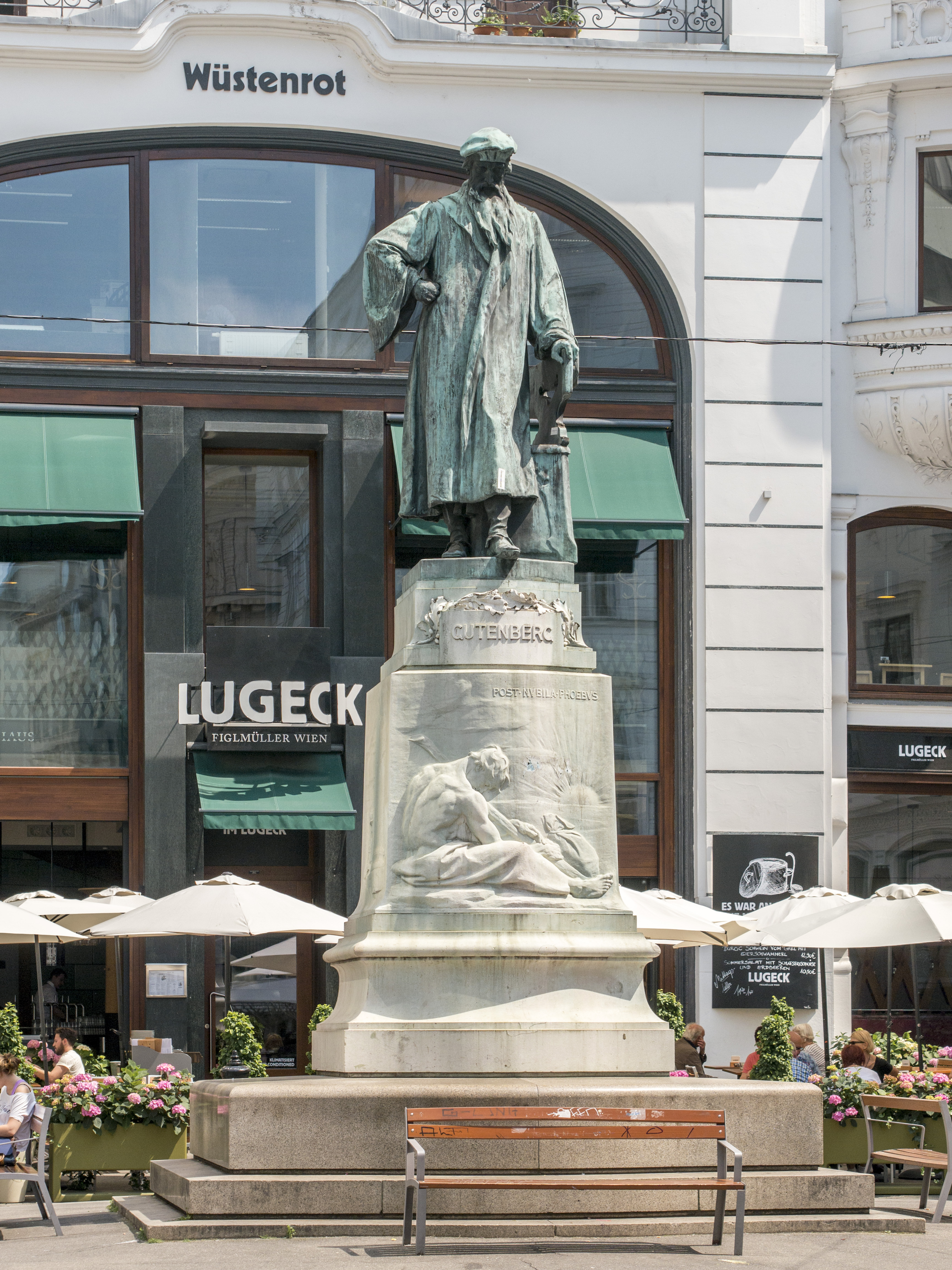
Gutenberg monument, Vienna (1900)

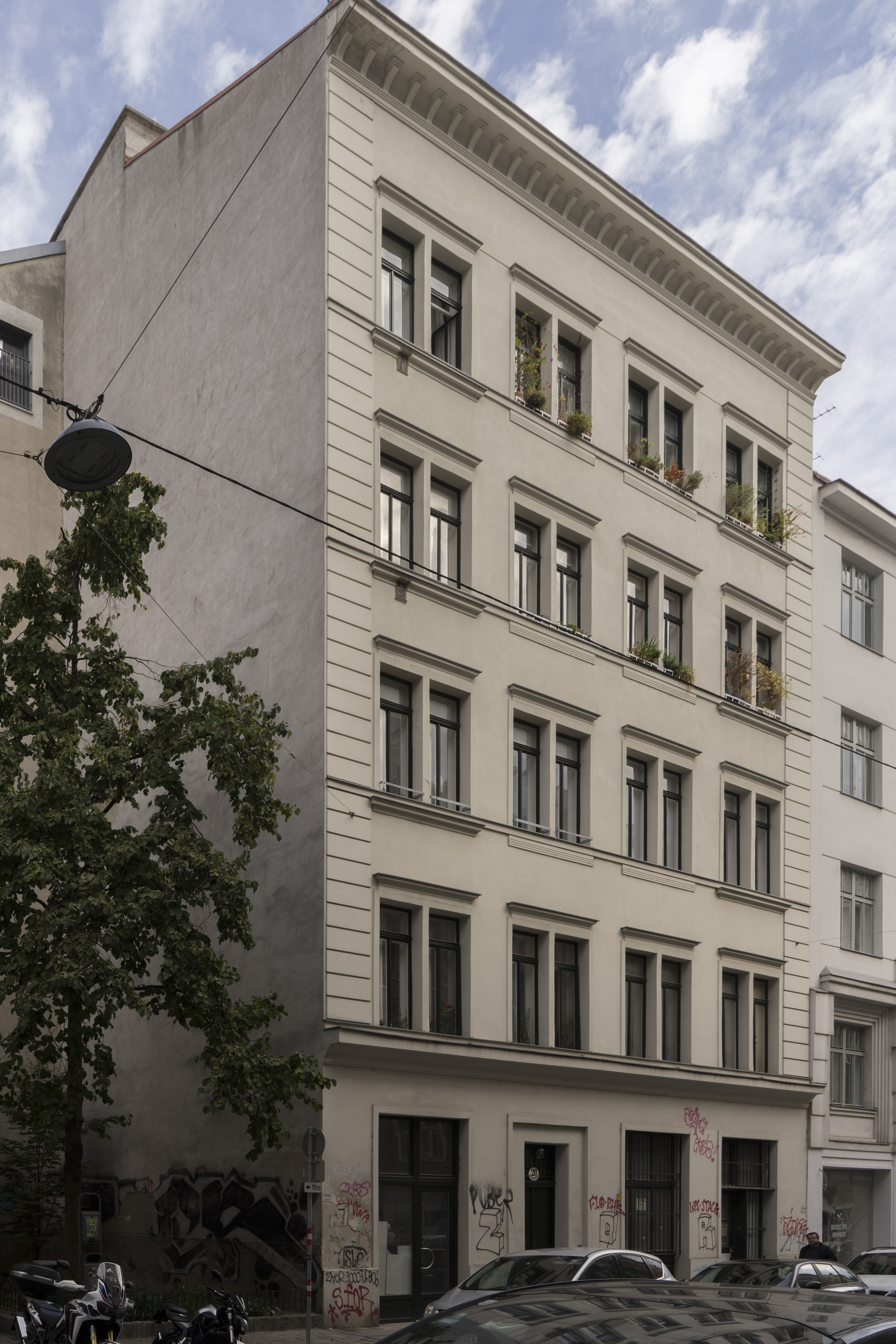
Piaristengasse 20, Vienna (1901)

House Krisper, Ljubljana (1901)

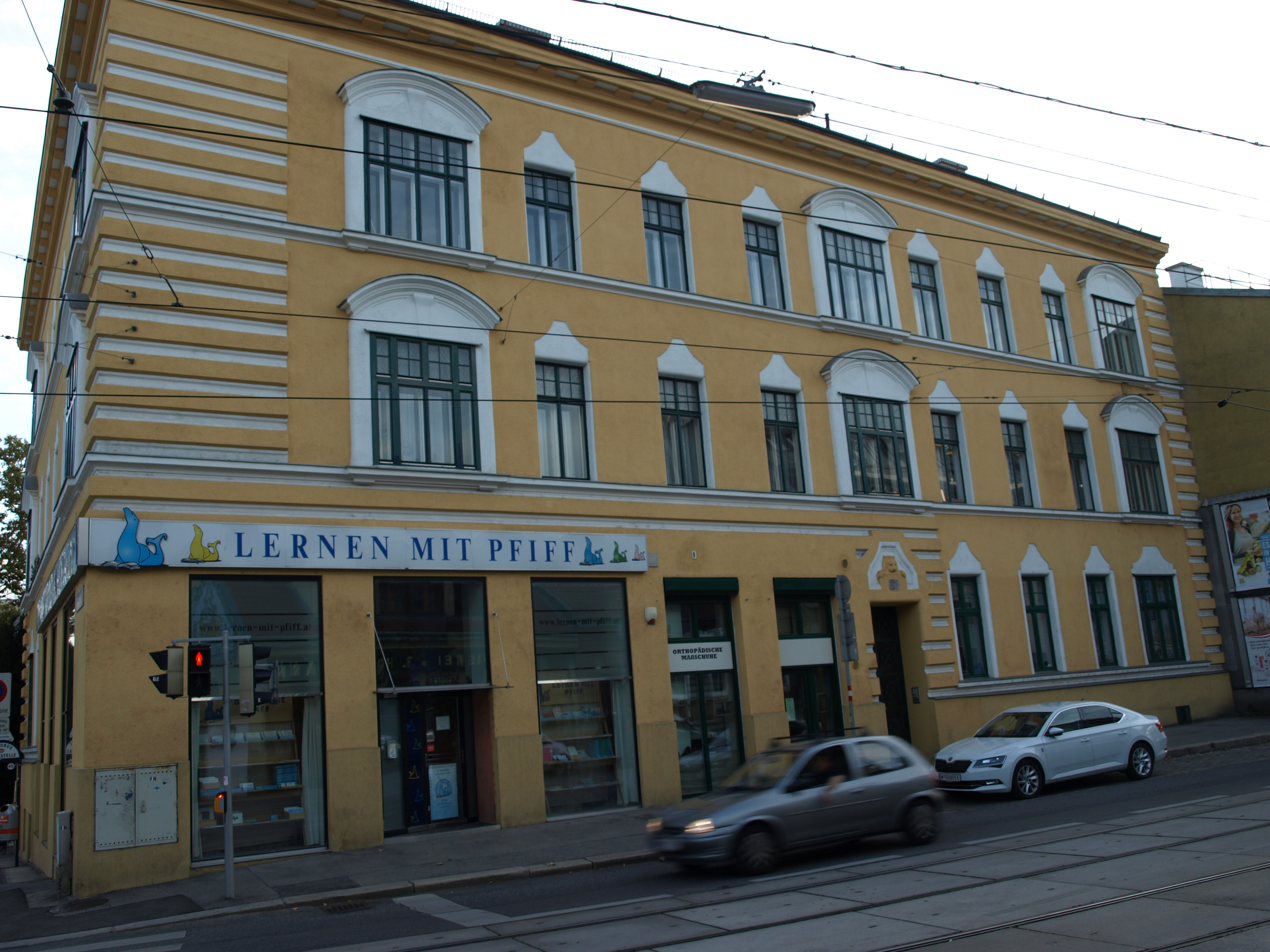
Linzer Straße 371, Vienna (1902)

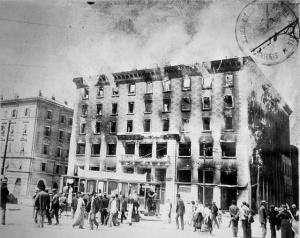
The Slovene Cultural Center burning (1905)

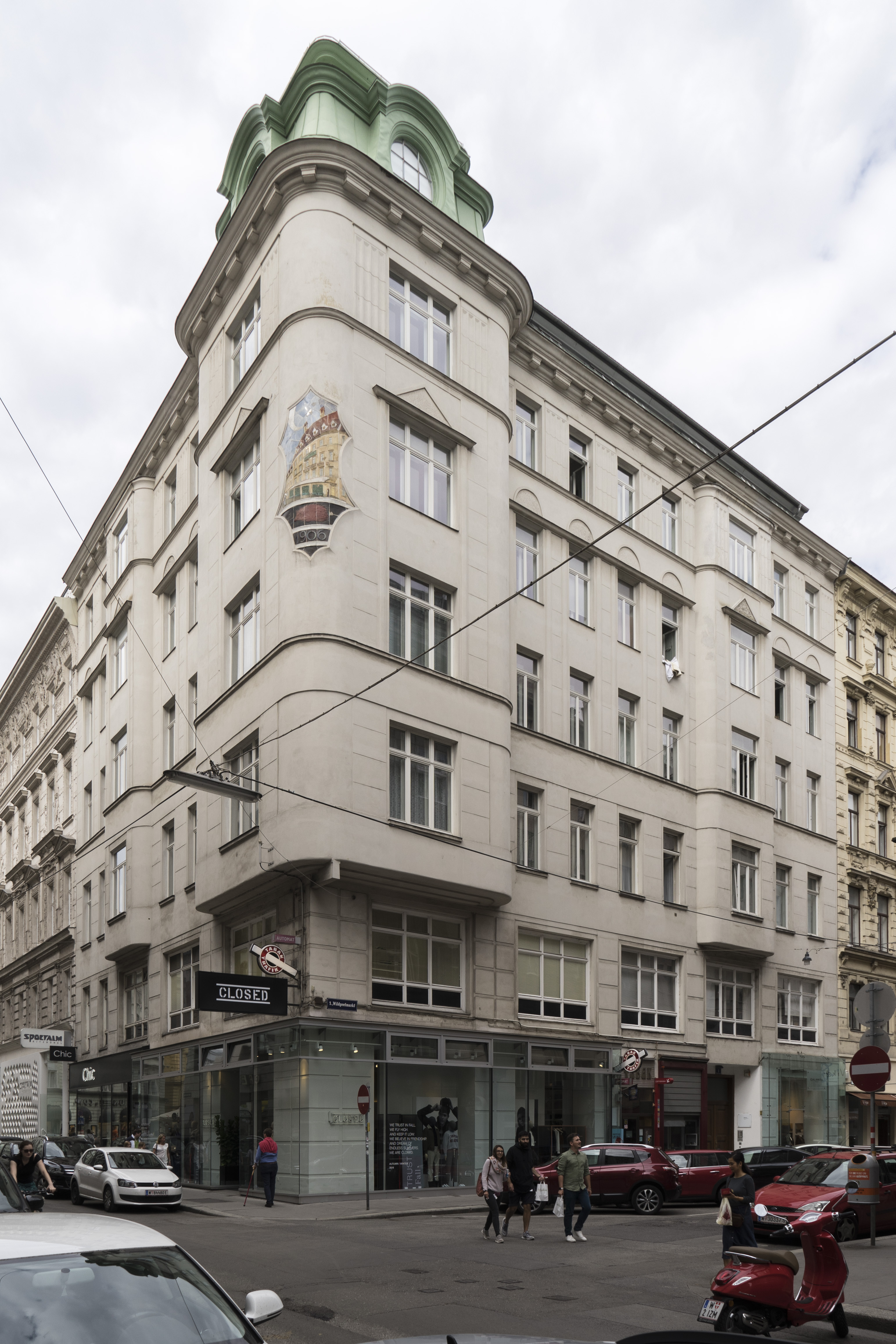
Wildpretmarkt 1, Vienna (1906)

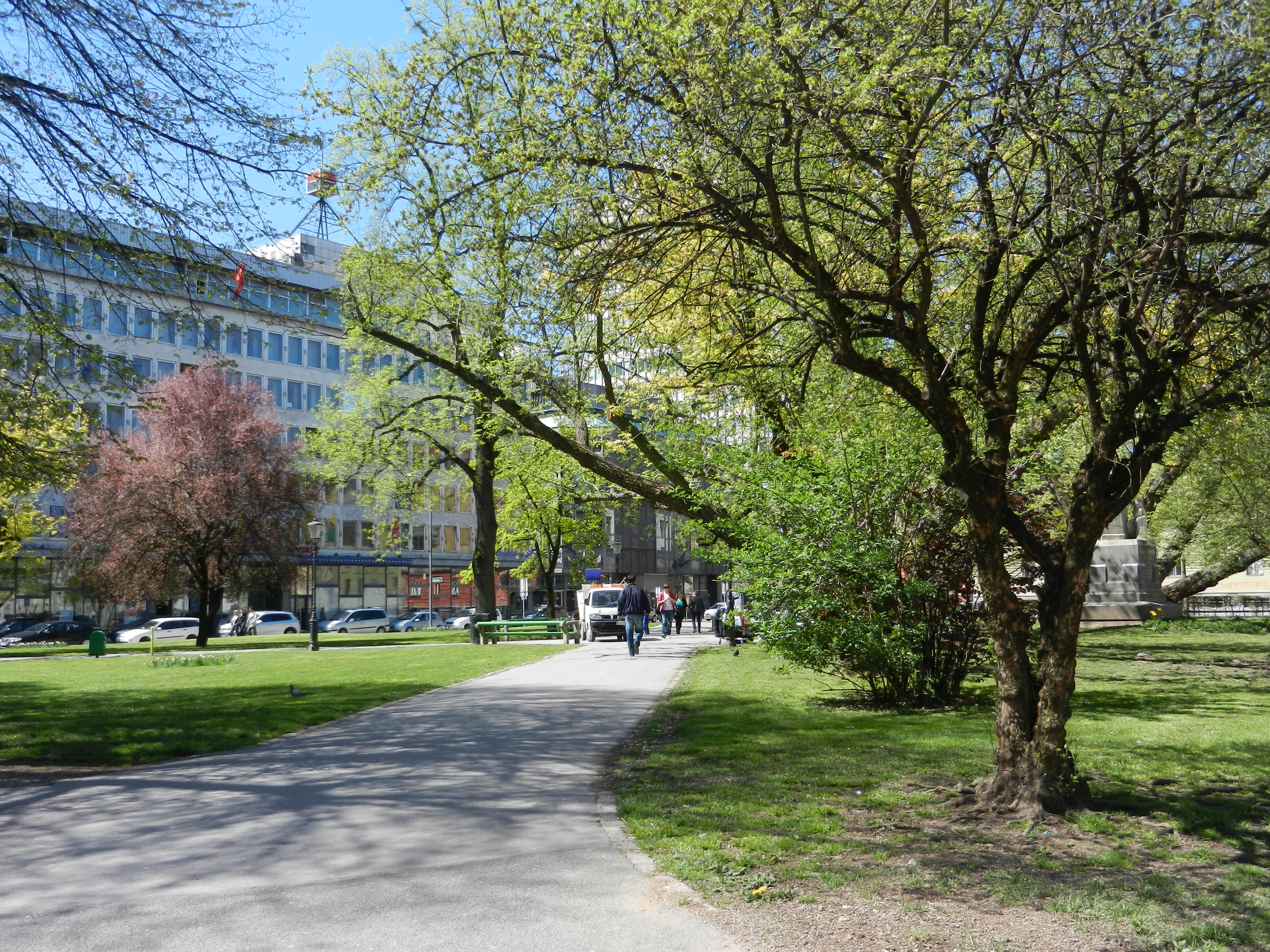
Miklošičev park, Ljubljana (1908)

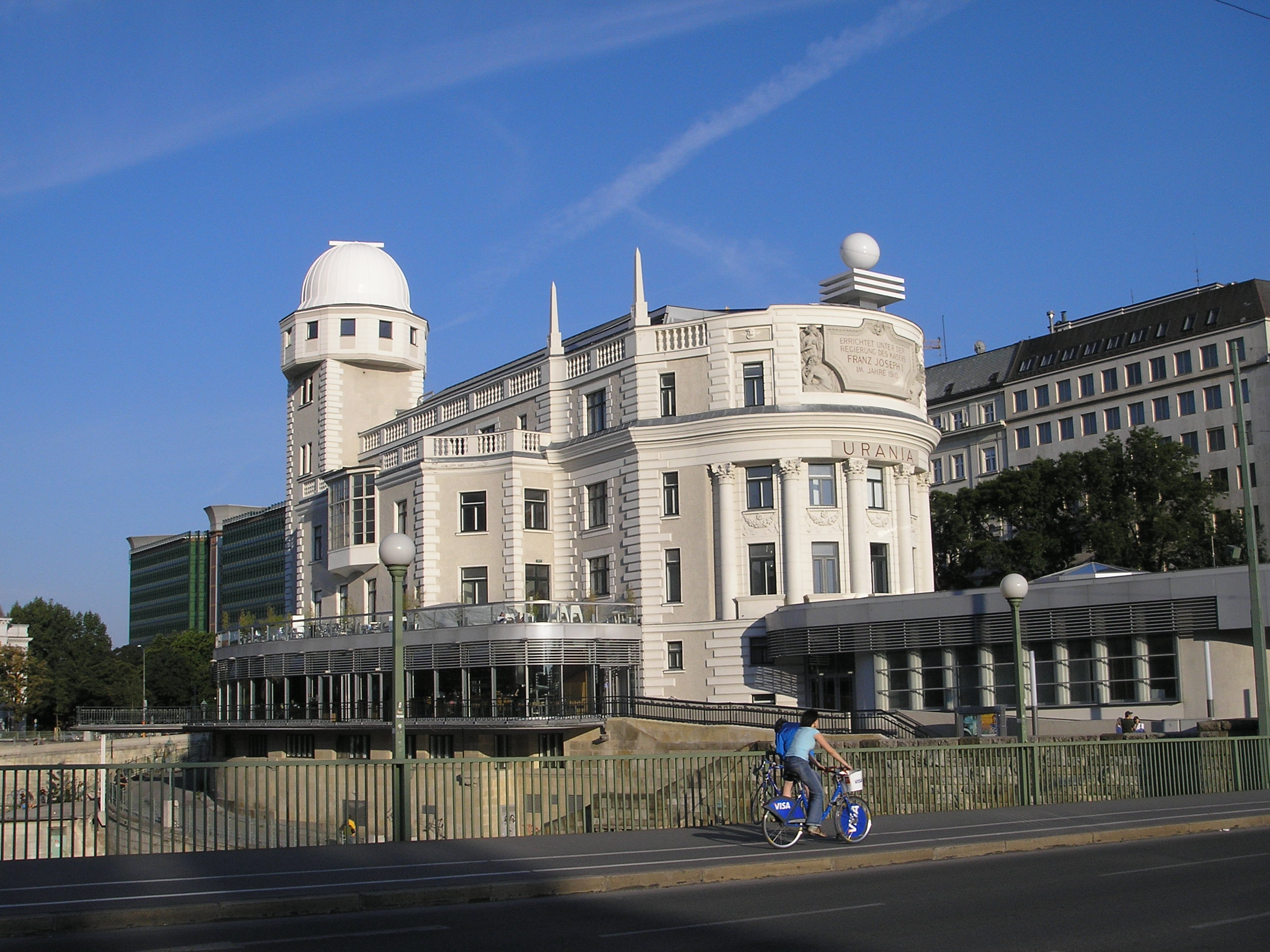
Urania, Vienna (1910)

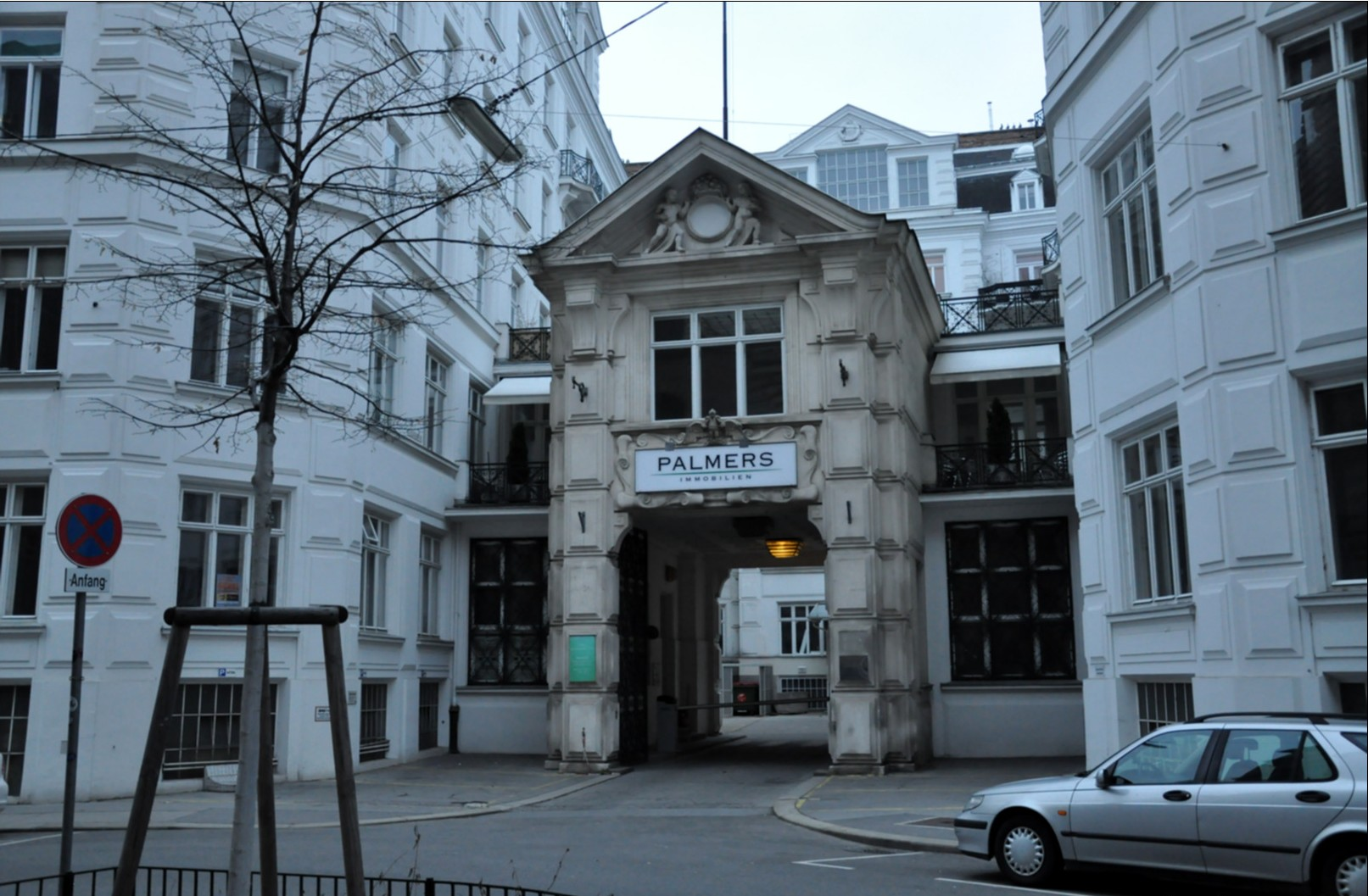
Lehargasse 9–11, Vienna (1913)

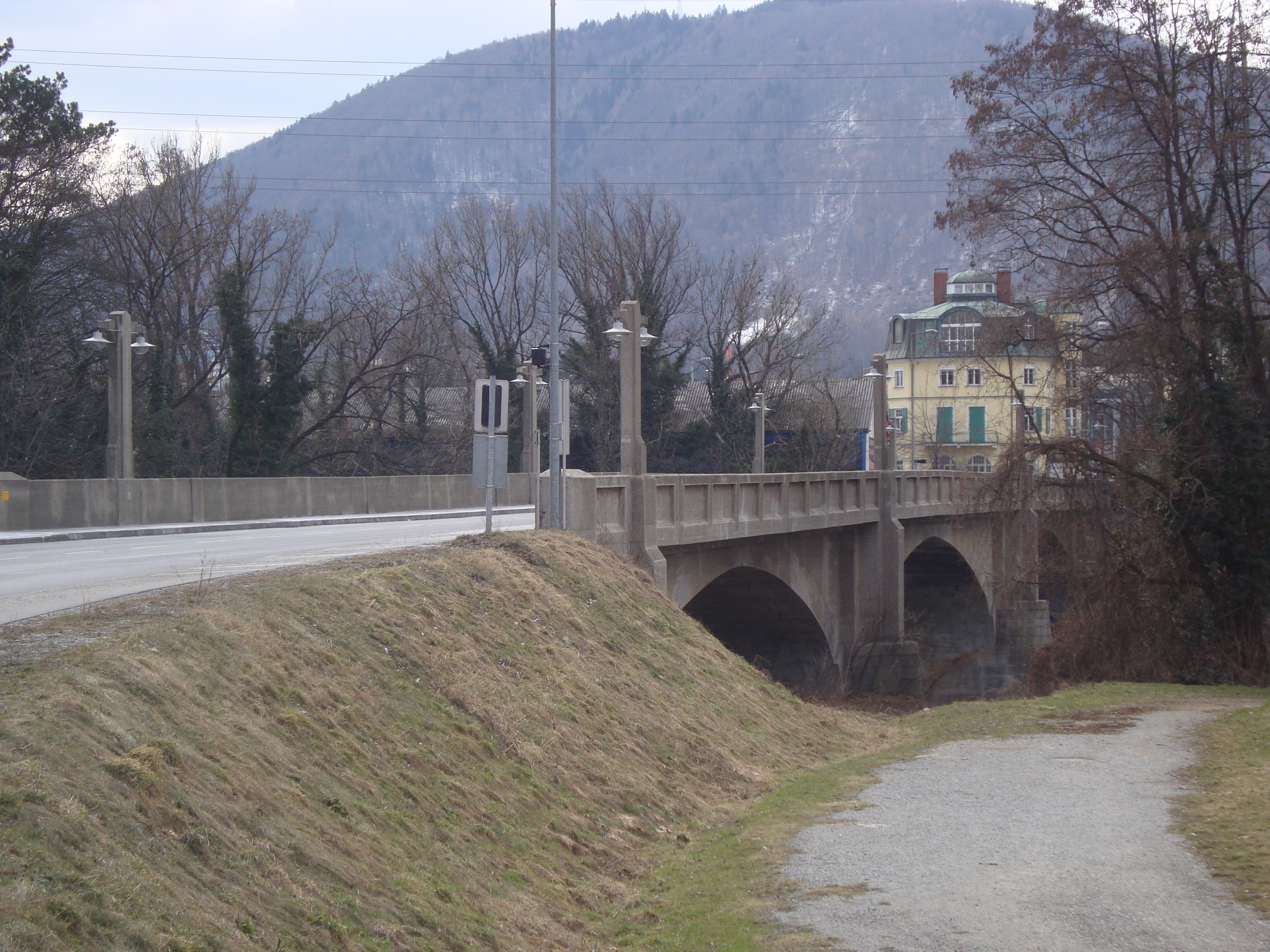
Bridge in Gratz (1917)
