= General Maister Monument (Brdar) =

Statue by Jakov Brdar in Ljubljana, Slovenia

Coordinates: 46°3′27″N 14°30′36.69″E

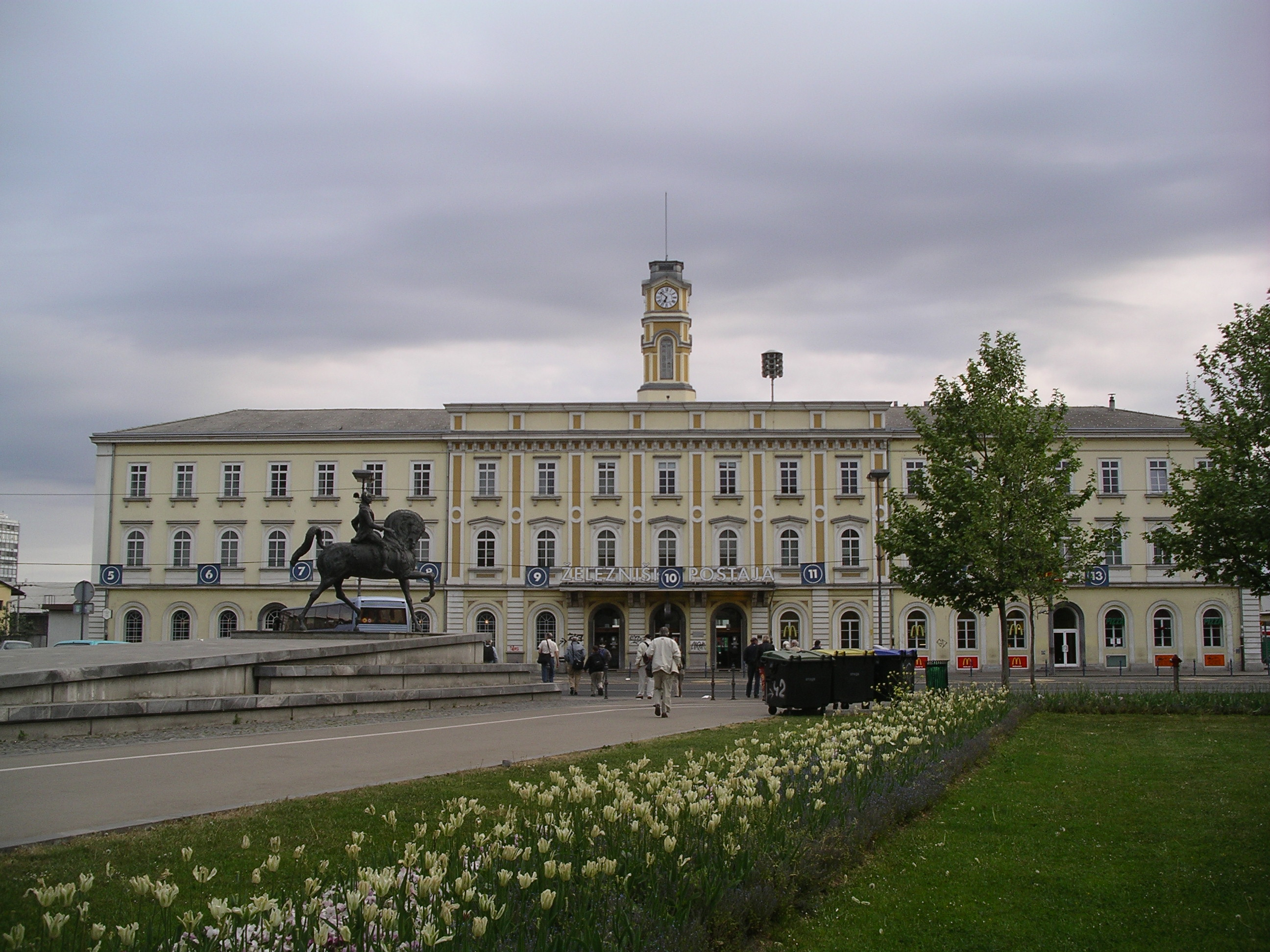
- Ljubljana station
- Artist: Jakov Brdar
- Year: 1999
- Type: Sculpture
- Location: Ljubljana

The General Maister Monument (Slovene: Spomenik generala Maistra) is a bronze equestrian statue of Rudolf Maister that stands in a park at Liberation Front Square (Trg Osvobodilne fronte) in front of the Ljubljana railway station. It was created in 1999 by Jakov Brdar as a tribute of the City of Ljubljana to Maister, the first Slovene major general, who secured for Slovenia the city of Maribor.
