= Central Pharmacy (Ljubljana) =

Pharmacy in Ljubljana, Slovenia

Coordinates: 46°3′5.65″N 14°30′23.36″E

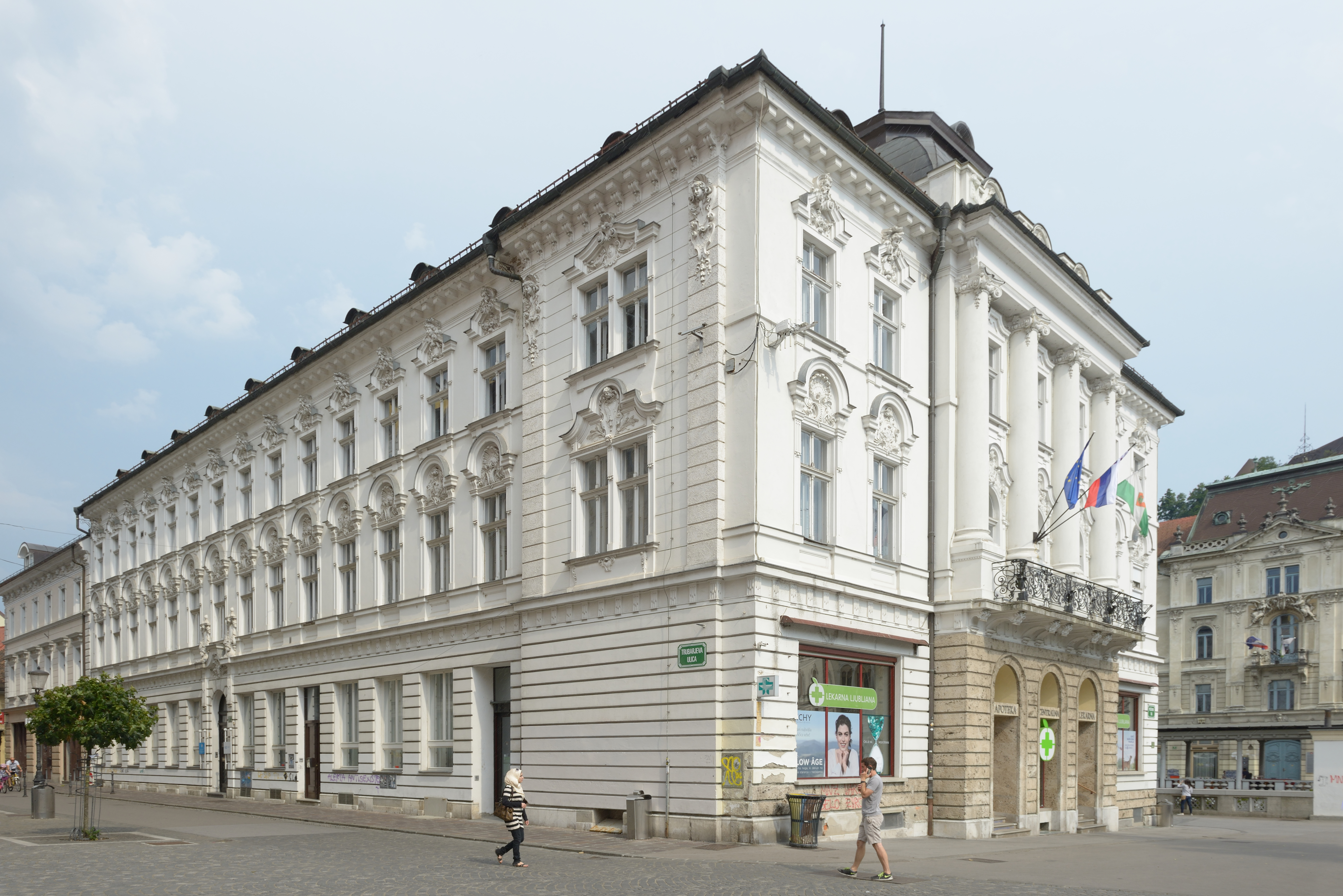
Central Pharmacy on Prešeren Square

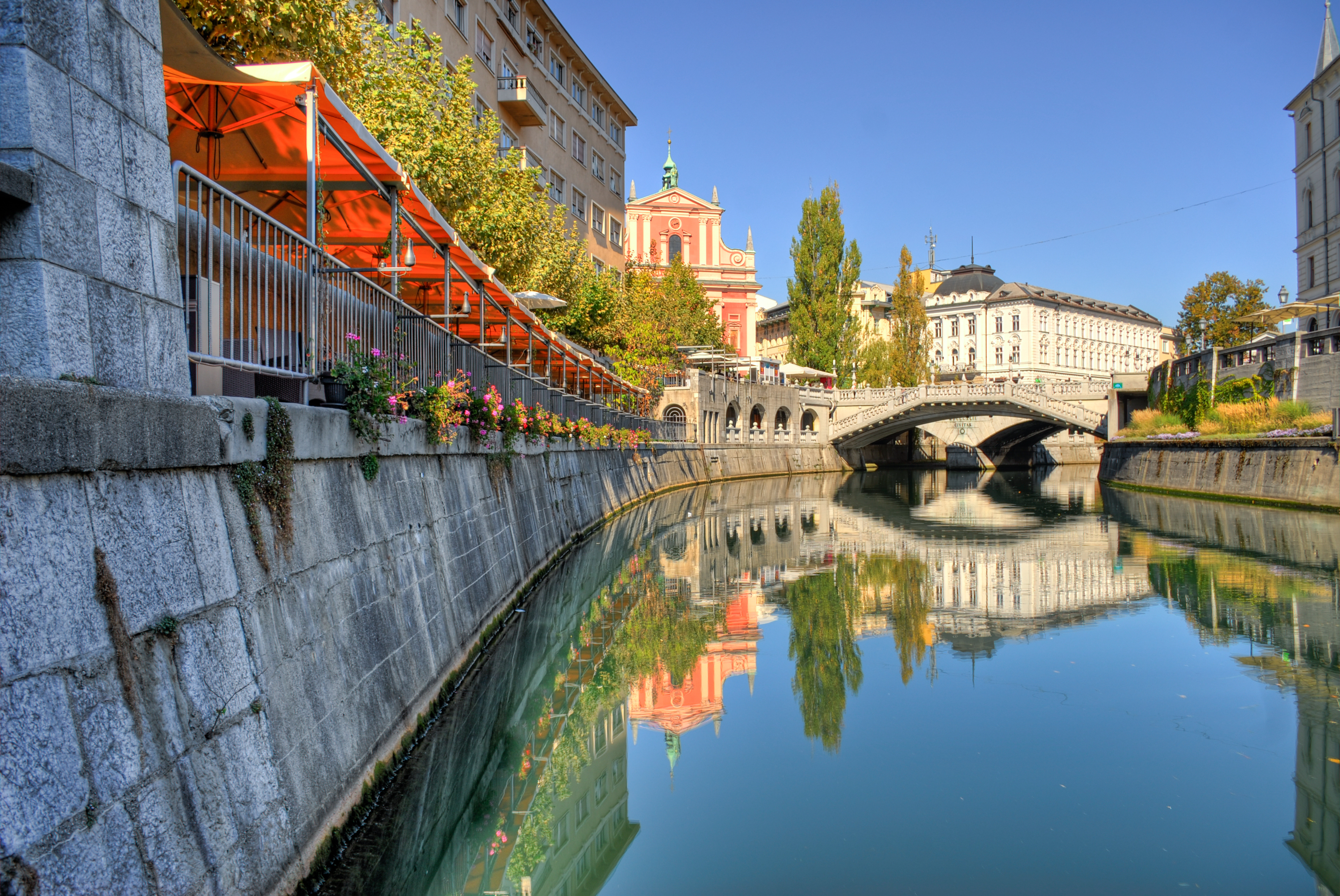
View of the Pharmacy from the Ljubljanica river, along with the Triple Bridge

The Ljubljana Central Pharmacy (Centralna lekarna Ljubljana), or shortly the Central Pharmacy (Centralna lekarna), is one of the most prominent buildings at Prešeren Square (Prešernov trg), the central square of the Slovenian capital of Ljubljana. It is also known as Mayer Palace (Slovene: Mayerjeva palača) or Prešeren Square 5 Palace (Palača Prešernov trg 5). It houses the city's central pharmacy.

The Neo-Renaissance building is located between Trubar Street (Trubarjeva cesta) and the Petkovšek Embankment (Petkovškovo nabrežje). It was designed in 1896–97 by Ferdinand Hauser and was built before the end of the century by Gustav Tönnies, whereas the façade was carried out by Filip Supančič. Until World War II, the building also housed a cafe named the Prešeren Cafe (Prešernova kavarna) after the poet France Prešeren (1800–1849).
