= Čop Street =

Street in Ljubljana, Slovenia

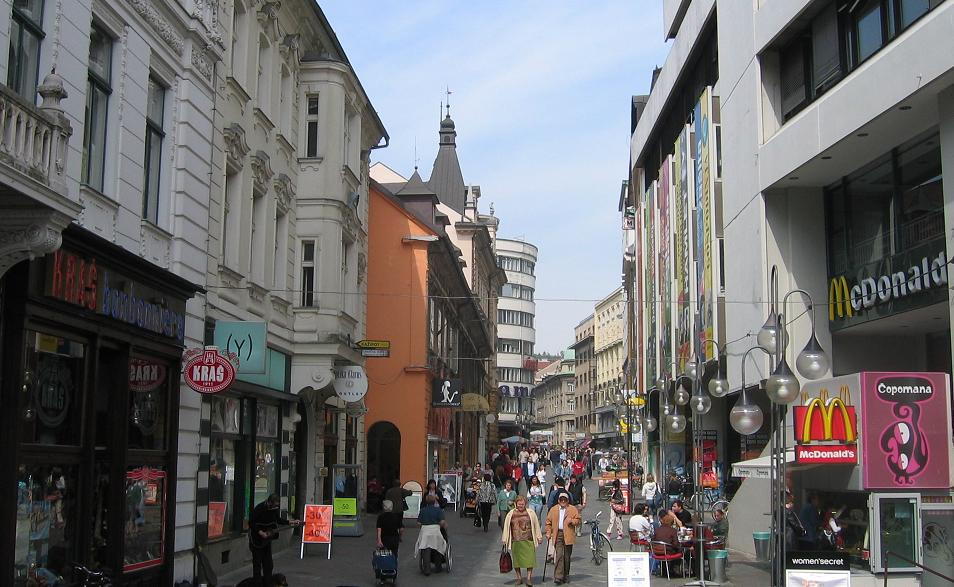
- Čop Street, as seen from Prešeren Square
- Native name: Čopova ulica (Slovene)
- Former name(s): Elephant Street; Slonova ulica Prešeren Street; Prešernova ulica
- Length: 205 m (673 ft)
- Location: Center District, Ljubljana, Slovenia
- Coordinates: 46.05191°N 14.50448°E
- Northwest end: Slovene Street (Slovenska cesta)
- Southeast end: Prešeren Square (Prešernov trg)

Čop Street (Slovene: Čopova ulica) is a major pedestrian thoroughfare in the center of Ljubljana, Slovenia and regarded as the capital's central promenade.

== Location ==
The street leads from the Main Post Office (Glavna pošta) at Slovene Street (Slovenska cesta) to Prešeren Square (Prešernov trg).

== History ==
Until the late 19th century, the street was known as Elephant Street (Slonova ulica) in memory of an elephant present in the city in the 16th century. A gift from the Ottoman sultan, the animal had been traveling in the entourage of Emperor Maximilian II on his way back from Spain to Germany, and had been stabled at what is now the upper part of the street in 1550, where the Slon Hotel now stands.

In 1892, the name of the street was changed to Prešeren Street (Prešernova ulica). In 1949, it was renamed Čop Street after Matija Čop, an early 19th-century literary figure and close friend of the Slovene Romantic poet France Prešeren.
