= Prešeren Square =

Central square in Ljubljana, Slovenia

Coordinates: 46°03′05″N 14°30′21″E

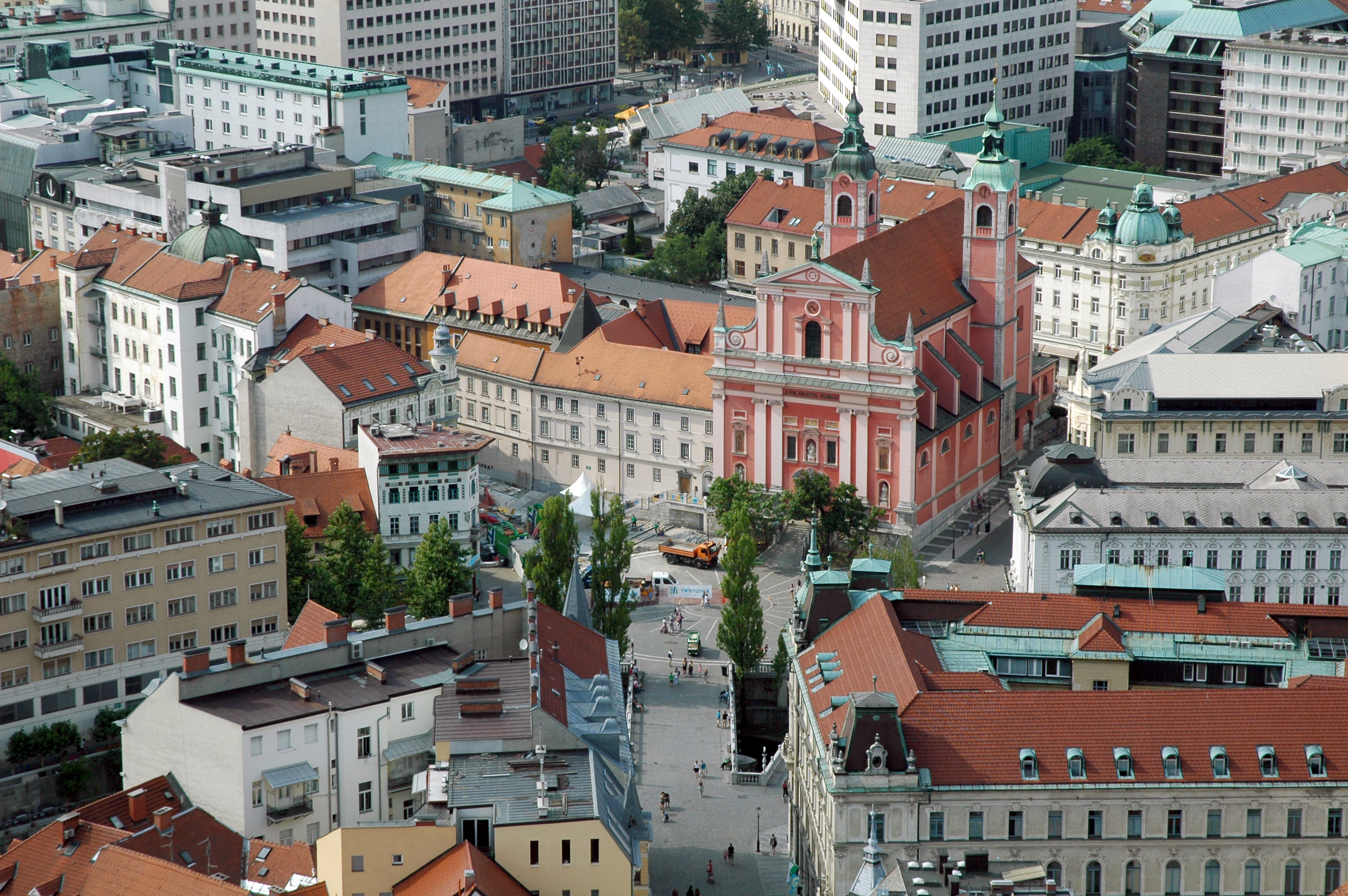
View of the square towards east. The Prešeren Monument stands at the eastern side of the square with the Central Pharmacy behind it and three birches at its side. On the left, the front facade of the Urbanc House and the front facade of the Franciscan Church of the Annunciation are visible. The street between the Central Pharmacy and the Urbanc House is Trubar Street. On the right, the Ljubljanica flows past the square.

Prešeren Square (Slovene: Prešernov trg) is the central square in Ljubljana, the capital of Slovenia. It is part of the old town's pedestrian zone and a major meeting point where festivals (like the annual Ljubljana Dragon Carnival), concerts, sports, political events, and protests take place. It was redesigned according to plans by Edvard Ravnikar from a funnel-shaped to a circular form in 1987–88 and renovated in 2007.

== Location ==
Lying in front of the medieval town's entrance, the square is a funnel-shaped hub of streets that run from it into different directions.

To the south, across the Triple Bridge (Tromostovje), it is connected to Stritar Street (Stritarjeva ulica), which leads through a symbolic town gate formed by the Kresija Palace and Philip Mansion towards the city's town hall at the foothills of the Castle Hill.

To the northwest, it is connected to Čop Street (Čopova ulica), which leads towards the Central Post Office and the Nama department store. To the north, Miklosich Street (Miklošičeva cesta) runs past a number of notable Secessionist buildings beginning with the Urbanc House, towards the Ljubljana railway station. Between Čop Street and Miklosich Street stand Ljubljana–Center Franciscan Monastery and the Franciscan Church of the Annunciation.

To the west, Wolf Street (Wolfova ulica) leads past the Mayer department store presently housing an office of Bank Austria and an outdoor cafe, towards Congress Square (Kongresni trg). On the southwest, the Hribar Embankment leads upstream the Ljubljanica past Mansion Square (Dvorni trg) towards Zois Mansion and St. James's Bridge.

To the east, past the Central Pharmacy building, the picturesque Trubar Street (Trubarjeva ulica) leads towards the Dragon Bridge. Parallel to the Ljubljanica River, the Petkovšek Embankment runs towards St. Peter's Church.

== History ==
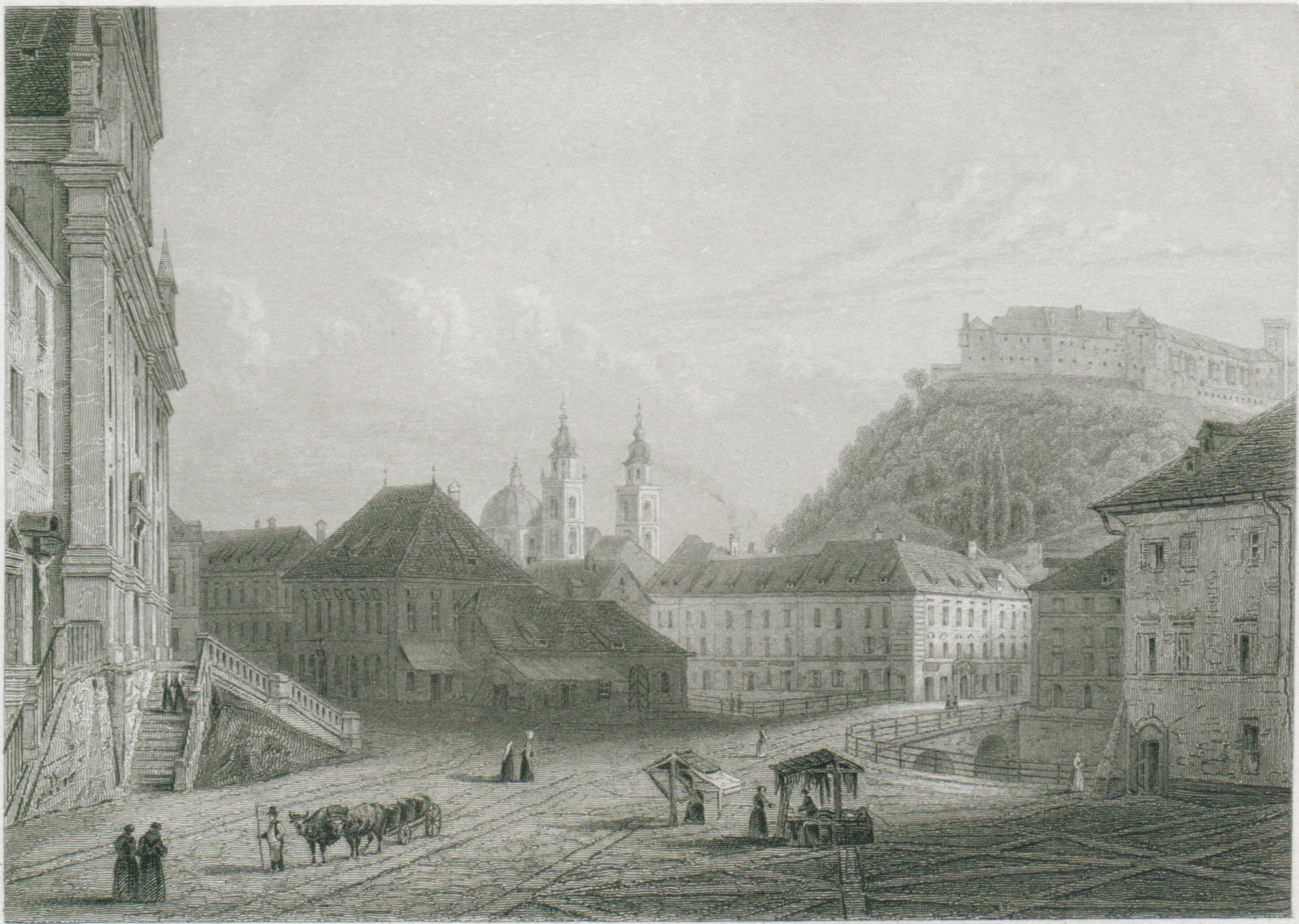
Prešeren Square in 1856

Prešeren Square gained its current appearance in the 17th century, when the baroque-style Franciscan Church of the Annunciation was built and was first known as St. Mary's Square after the church. In the 19th century, the crossroad was changed into a square and paved. After the 1895 Ljubljana earthquake, architect Max Fabiani designed the square as the hub of four streets. In place of the medieval houses which were damaged by the earthquake, a number of palaces were built around it. Between Wolf Street and Čop Street stands the Hauptmann House, built in 1873 and renovated in 1904 in the Secessionist style by the architect Ciril Metod Koch. The other palaces include the Frisch House, the Seunig House and the Urbanc House, as well as the Mayer department store, built thirty years later.

Since 3 September 2007, Prešeren Square has been closed for motorised traffic, except for a local tourist bus.

== Design ==
In the 1980s, Edvard Ravnikar proposed the circular design and the granite block pavement, with a circle and radiant lines of Macedonian Sivec marble. There was also a proposal by Ravnikar to put a fountain to the square, but was not accepted by residents of the city. The core city center has been closed for motor traffic since September 2007 (except for residents with permissions), creating a pedestrian zone around Prešeren Square.

== Monuments ==
=== Prešeren Monument ===
At the eastern side of the square, a bronze statue of the Slovene national poet France Prešeren with a muse was erected in front of the Central Pharmacy in 1905. The sculpture, designed by Ivan Zajec, stands on a pedestal designed by the architect Max Fabiani. Later, three birches were planted behind Prešeren Monument, indicating the energy centre of Ljubljana. Poplars were added in the 1930s next to the Triple Bridge, according to the plan by the architect Jože Plečnik. In June 1991, Prešeren Square and the Prešeren Monument were declared a cultural monument of national significance. In October 2005, the Prešeren Monument was renovated.

=== Scale model of Ljubljana ===
In 1991, a bronze scale model of Ljubljana was set at the upper end of the square as a gift by the city's Urban Planning Institute. It has a form of a 2.2 by 2.2 metres (7 ft 3 in by 7 ft 3 in) square. It was created by a number of experts, whereas the banks around it, its pedestal, location, and coordination of work were taken care of by the architect Jadranka Grmek. In 2009, a white semi-circular bank was added to the model of Ljubljana.

== Depictions ==
Prešeren Square was depicted on numerous postcards particularly at the turn of the 19th and the 20th centuries. Some of them present it at special occasions, like after the 1895 Ljubljana earthquake or at unveiling of the Prešeren Monument, whereas others present it as it was at an ordinary occasion.

Since June 2008, a model of the square is displayed at Mini-Europe in Brussels on an area of 20 square metres (220 sq ft).

== Gallery ==
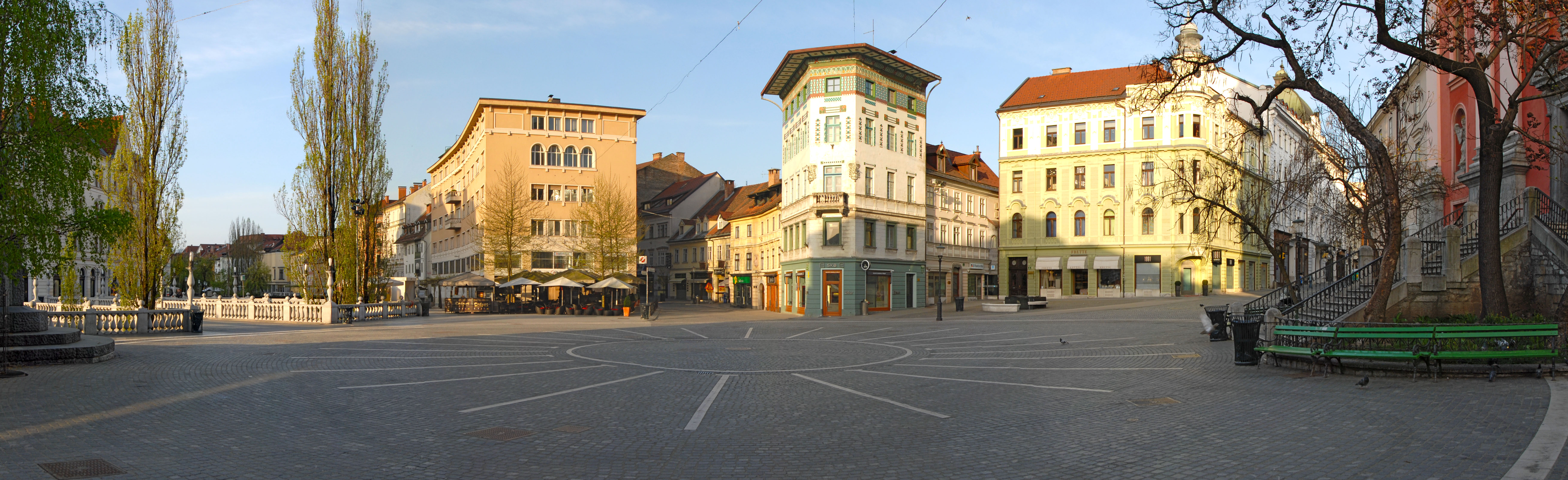
Prešeren Square in the morning sun (April 2011)
