= Ivan Zajec =

Slovenian sculptor (1869–1952)

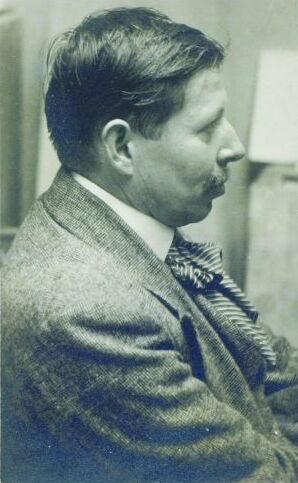
- Born: 15 July 1869; Ljubljana, Austria-Hungary
- Died: 30 July 1952 (aged 83); Ljubljana, Yugoslavia
- Occupation: Sculptor

Ivan Zajec (15 July 1869 – 30 July 1952) was a Slovenian sculptor. His work was part of the sculpture event in the art competition at the 1924 Summer Olympics. He also designed a monument designated to France Prešeren together with Max Fabiani.
