= Center District, Ljubljana =

Coordinates: 46°03′06″N 14°30′22″E

Center District
- City district
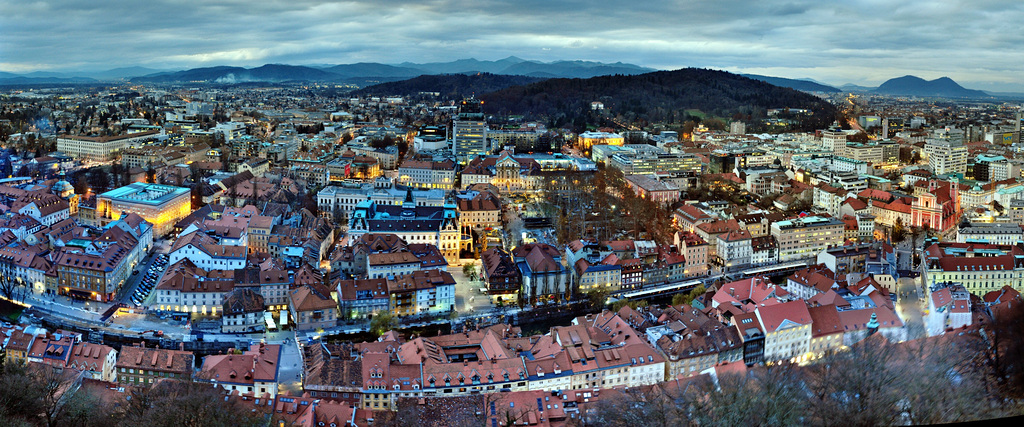
- Night view of the Center District of Ljubljana
- Interactive map of Center District
- Country: Slovenia
- Region: Central Slovenia
- City: Ljubljana

Area
  - Total: 5.0 km^{2} (1.9 sq mi)

Population
  - Total: 23,706
  - Density: 4,700/km^{2} (12,000/sq mi)
- Time zone: UTC+1 (CET)
  - Summer (DST): UTC+2 (CEST)

The Center District (Slovene: Četrtna skupnost Center), or simply the Center, is a district (mestna četrt) of the City Municipality of Ljubljana in the centre of Ljubljana, the capital of Slovenia. It has an area of about 5 square kilometres (1.9 sq mi).

The district's major thoroughfares are Slovene Street (Slovenska cesta), Čop Street (Čopova ulica), Cankar Street (Cankarjeva cesta), Wolf Street (Wolfova ulica), Trubar Street (Trubarjeva cesta), and Miklosich Street (Miklošičeva cesta), and the major squares are Congress Square (Kongresni trg), Croatian Square (Hrvatski trg), Liberation Front Square (Trg Osvobodilne fronte), Prešeren Square (Prešernov trg), Republic Square (Trg republike), and Slovene Square (Slovenski trg).
