= Neža Ema Mikec =

Slovenian embroiderer (1877–1967)

- Born: Agnes Mikec; January 9, 1877; Leskovec, Austria-Hungary
- Died: March 2, 1967 (aged 90); Radovljica, Slovenia
- Occupation: embroiderer

Neža Mikec, sister Ema, (9 January 1877 – 2 March 1967) was a Slovenian embroiderer. As a member of the School Sisters of Christ the King, she led the convent embroidery workshop in Maribor and, in collaboration with Helena Kottler Vurnik and Ivan Vurnik, she helped shape 20th-century Slovene ecclesiastical textile art.

== Early life ==
Neža Ema Mikec was born into a devout family on 9 January 1877 in Leskovec near Novo Mesto. Her mother was the farmer Maria Gričar and her father the farmer Georg Mikec. She first attended primary school in Velika Brusnica, then the convent school of the School Sisters of Notre Dame in Šmihel near Novo Mesto. In Šmihel she also learned embroidery. In 1892 she began attending the private women's teacher-training school of the School Sisters of Christ the King in Maribor.

== Work ==
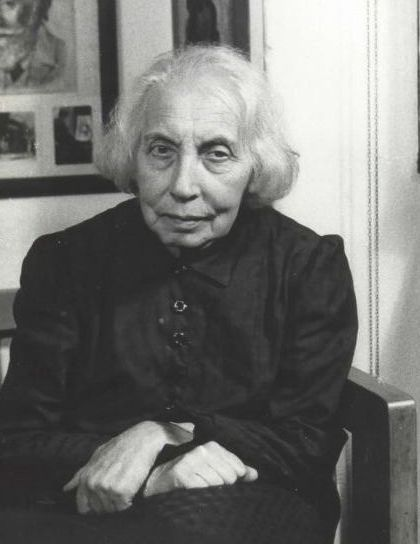
Artist Helena Kottler Vurnik

In 1896 she entered the convent of the School Sisters of Christ the King. In 1897 she passed the exam to become a school teacher for lower classes. In 1899 she began working in the order's embroidery workshop in Maribor. Between 1903 and 1904 she refined her technical skills at the applied-arts school of the Sisters of Mary in Vienna. In 1907 she took over management of the Maribor convent embroidery workshop and raised it to a high technical and aesthetic level.

The products made in the workshop during the first decade of her leadership display many skillfully employed embroidery techniques, though their aesthetics were not yet fully mature. After World War I she began to collaborate with the artist Helena Kottler Vurnik and her husband, the architect Ivan Vurnik. Works created in collaboration with them, using simple means, achieved an elemental monumentality. In particular, the appliqué technique, by then largely absent from embroidery, was revived in pieces based on Helena Kottler Vurnik and Ivan Vurnik's designs. A wide range of embroidery techniques was employed. The works produced under Mikec's leadership in the Maribor workshop represent a pinnacle of Slovene embroidery, both for their distinctive artistic conception, unique in world production, and for their exceptionally accomplished technical execution.

== Later life ==
After World War II, many School Sisters were imprisoned or expelled. The convent embroidery workshop in Maribor continued to operate, but on a much smaller scale. Mikec died on 2 March 1967 in Radovljica.

== Selected works ==
Notable works produced in the School Sisters' embroidery workshop under Mikec's direction include:

- Eagle flags for Teharje (1919), after designs by Helena Kottler Vurnik;
- Chasuble for Selca (1919), after designs by Ivan Vurnik;
- Canopy for St. Peter's Church in Ljubljana (1921), after designs by Ivan Vurnik;
- Chasuble for the Jesuit church in Ljubljana (1922), after designs by Helena Kottler Vurnik;
- Chasuble for the golden jubilee Mass of Bishop Anton Bonaventura Jeglič (1923), after designs by Helena Kottler Vurnik;
- Cope of St. Francis for Franc Kimovec (1928; a high point of the appliqué technique), after designs by Helena Kottler Vurnik;
- Altar frontals for Domžale (1928), the Marijanišče in Ljubljana (1932), and the Franciscan church in Maribor (1932), after designs by Ivan Vurnik;
- Pluvial and veil for Predoslje (1929), after designs by Helena Kottler Vurnik;
- Flags of the Sodality of Our Lady in Ptuj (1930) and Konjice (1931), after designs by Helena Kottler Vurnik;
- Bled church flag (1932), after designs by Helena Kottler Vurnik;
- Flag of the St. Peter's Sodality of Our Lady in Ljubljana (1933), after a design by Slavko Pengov;
- Flag for the Sodality of Our Lady, Šiška (1933; motif: "the woman clothed with the sun"); after designs by Helena Kottler Vurnik;
- Flag of the cultural society in Komenda (date not specified), after designs by Ivan Vurnik;
- Cloaks of the Sacred Heart for Ihan and of Christ the King for Šmartno pri Slovenj Gradcu (date not specified), after designs by Helena Kottler Vurnik;
- Flag of the Sacred Heart Sodality for Cleveland (date not specified), after designs by Helena Kottler Vurnik;
- Chasuble of the Sacred Heart for Kansas City (date not specified), after designs by Helena Kottler Vurnik;
- Annunciation of Mary (owned by the Kobi family of Borovnica) (date not specified), after designs by Helena Kottler Vurnik.
