= List of Slovenian architects =

Following is a list of notable architects from the country of Slovenia.

== A–M ==
- Ilija Arnautović
- Alenka Kham Pičman
- Max Fabiani
- Boris Kobe
- Ciril Metod Koch
- Franko Luin
- Marko Mušič

== N–Z ==
- Jože Plečnik
- Boris Podrecca
- Marjetica Potrč
- Edvard Ravnikar
- Vojteh Ravnikar
- Savin Sever
- Vladimir Šubic
- Viktor Sulčič
- Ivan Vurnik

== See also ==
- Architecture of Slovenia
- List of architects
- List of Slovenes
