= Vurnik =

Vurnik is a Slovenian surname. Notable people with this surname include:

- Helena Kottler Vurnik (1882–1962), Slovenian artist
- Ivan Vurnik (1884–1971), Slovenian architect
