= St. Peter's Parish Church (Ljubljana) =

Roman Catholic church in Ljubljana, Slovenia

Coordinates: 46°3′7.65″N 14°31′6.57″E

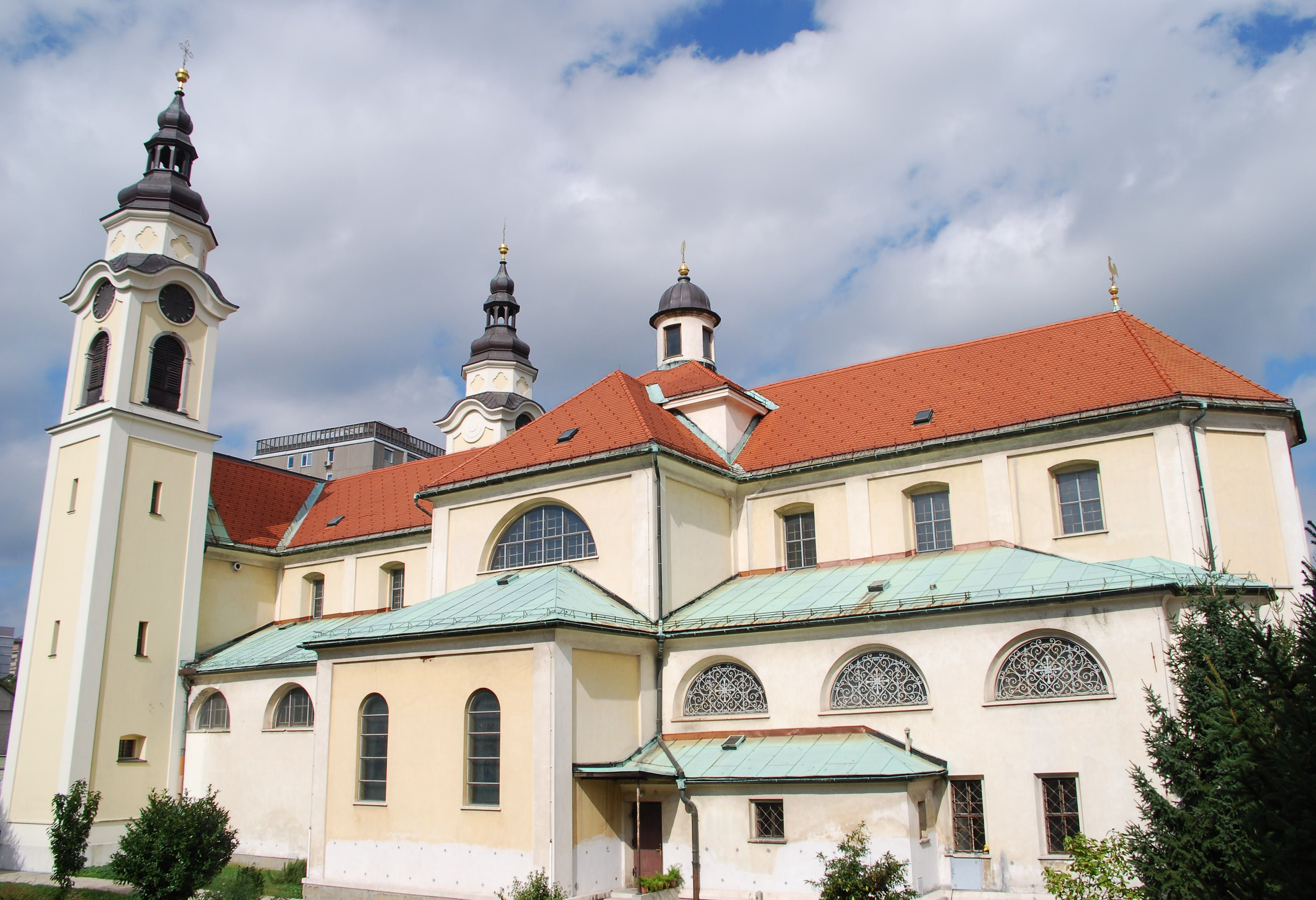
St. Peter's Church in Ljubljana

St. Peter's Parish Church (Slovene: Župnijska cerkev sv. Petra, Šempetrska cerkev or Šentpetrska cerkev) is a Roman Catholic church in Ljubljana, the capital of Slovenia. It is one of the oldest churches in Ljubljana and is the seat of Ljubljana–St. Peter parish. It is located in the Center District, at the corner of Trubar Street (Trubarjeva cesta), Njegoš Street (Njegoševa cesta) and Zalog Street (Zaloška cesta), near Croatian Square (Hrvatski trg). The University Medical Centre Ljubljana is situated in the immediate vicinity.

== History ==
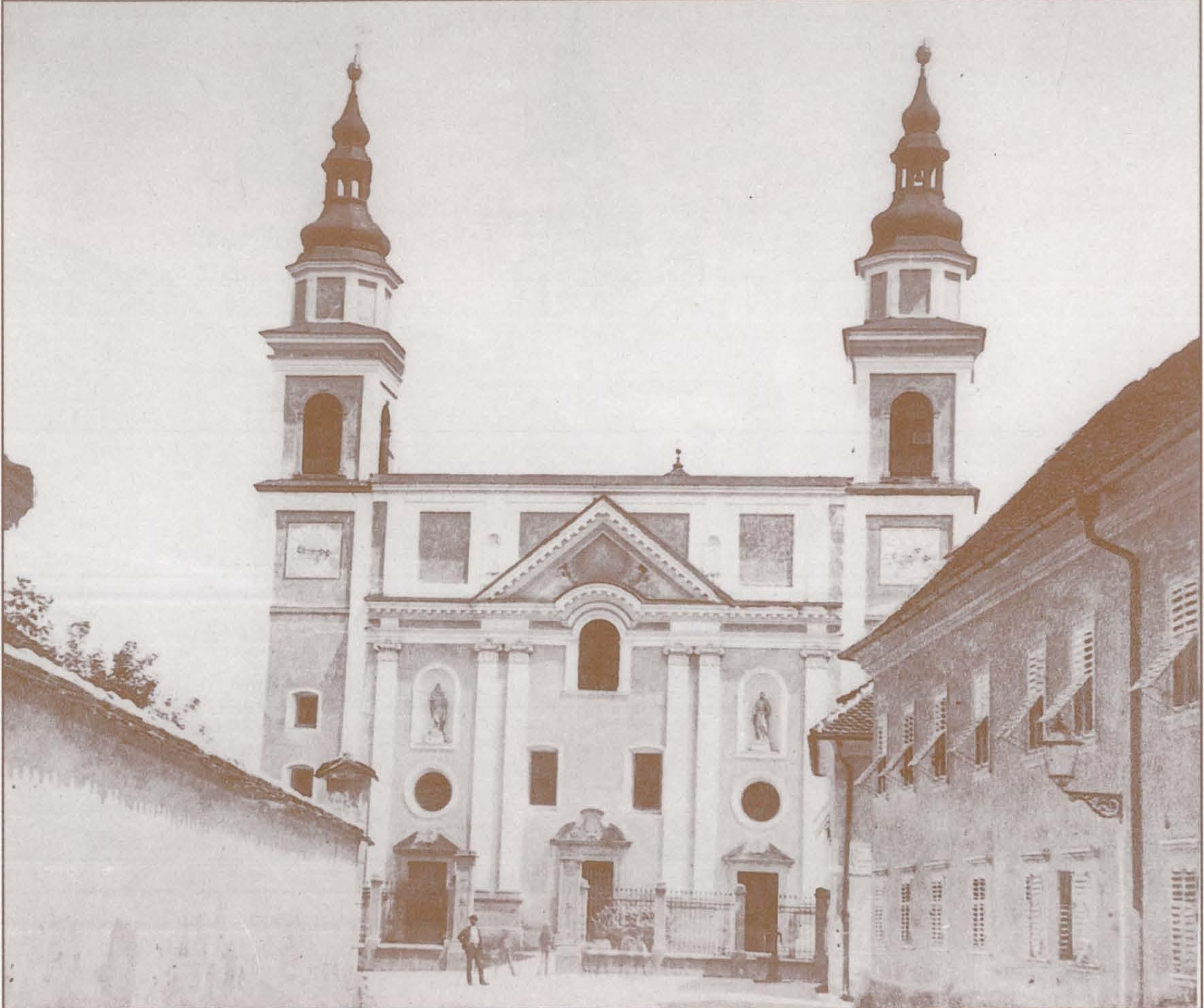
St. Peter's Church in 1890s

The original church at the site was presumably built near the city walls already at the turn of the 9th century on the order of Paulinus II, the Patriarch of Aquilea. It was the seat of the Primitive Parish of Ljubljana. The church was encircled by a cemetery that was the main town cemetery until 1779, when it was abandoned.

The current building was erected in a Baroque style between 1730 and 1733 upon the plans of the architect Carlo Martinuzzi, who based them upon the Church of San Giorgio Maggiore in Venice. The model of the church was made by Giovanni Fusconi, who also gave some technical advice. The church was built by the master builder Gregor Maček Jr. Interior division of the church has been preserved from the period.

After the Ljubljana earthquake of 1895, the church was renovated by the architect Raimund Jeblinger in a neo-baroque style. This renovation was strongly criticised for its supposed low quality, and was followed by another, done between 1938 and 1940. The façade was completely remodeled by the architect Ivan Vurnik, while his wife Helena Vurnik contributed new interior decorations and mosaics. The church's ceiling frescoes are the work of baroque painter Fran Jelovšek; altar paintings are by Valentin Metzinger.

== Cultural references ==
Until 1952, Trubar Street was known as St. Peter's Street (Sv. Petra cesta). The nearby St. Peter's Bridge across the Ljubljanica is named after the church. The church also gave its name to the former barracks housed at Vraz Square (Vrazov trg).
