= Cooperative Business Bank Building (Ljubljana) =

Vienna Secession building in Ljubljana

Coordinates: 46°03′10.55″N 14°30′24.3″E

Cooperative Business Bank Building, Ljubljiana (2017)

The Cooperative Business Bank Building is a building designed in 1921 by the architect Ivan Vurnik and his wife Helena Vurnik in the so-called Slovene "National Style" using decorative ornaments in the colors of Slovene tricolor and was inspired by the Vienna Secession style of architecture (a type of Art Nouveau). It was commissioned by the Cooperative Business Bank (Slovene: Zadružna gospodarska banka), a local credit institution. It is located on Miklosich Street, Ljubljana, capital city of Slovenia, and has been called "the most beautiful building" in Ljubljana.

== Architecture ==
The facade is richly decorated and has five floors and in each one five windows looking toward Miklosich Street. The interior features wall paintings and a glass ceiling with decorative multicolored bottles built into it. The staircase hall on the first and second floor have stained glass windows, depicting geometric motifs.
