= Faculty of Architecture, Ljubljana =

Coordinates: 46°2′44″N 14°30′14″E

Faculty of Architecture (also known as Ljubljana School of Architecture), established in 1919 in Ljubljana, is a faculty with a long tradition and with notable architects including Jože Plečnik, Max Fabiani, and Edvard Ravnikar. It is still considered one of the best Central European schools of architecture, offering academic education in the fields of architecture, interior design, urban design, graphic design, product design, as well as professional research in the areas.

Enrolment entails an entrance exam. Each year 135 regular and 45 part-time students are accepted. There are almost 700 students enrolled in the graduate course.

The teaching and associate staff includes some 65 employees.

Since the year 2000, within students exchange Erasmus programmes there are annually 50 incoming (each year increasing) and around 40 outgoing students (both exchanges and placements).

== Building ==
In the 1950s, Jože Plečnik added the front gate to the building after the school moved to the present location.
