= Ciril Metod Koch =

Slovene architect

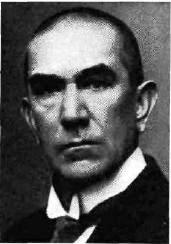
Ciril Metod Koch

Ciril Metod Koch (31 March 1867 – 6 May 1925) was a Slovene architect. Together with Max Fabiani, he introduced the Vienna Secession style in the Slovene Lands.

Koch was born in Kranj, then part of the Duchy of Carniola in the Austro-Hungarian Monarchy, now in Slovenia. He studied in Ljubljana, Graz, and in Vienna. In 1893, he got a job in the Ljubljana City Urban Planning Office. He rose to prominence after the Ljubljana earthquake, when he reconstructed several buildings in the Vienna Secession style.

Between 1895 and 1910, he designed numerous buildings in Ljubljana, Celje, Radovljica, Opatija, Bohinj, and Šternberk.

He died in Ljubljana.

== Gallery ==
Architecture in the centre of Ljubljana, designed by Ciril Metod Koch

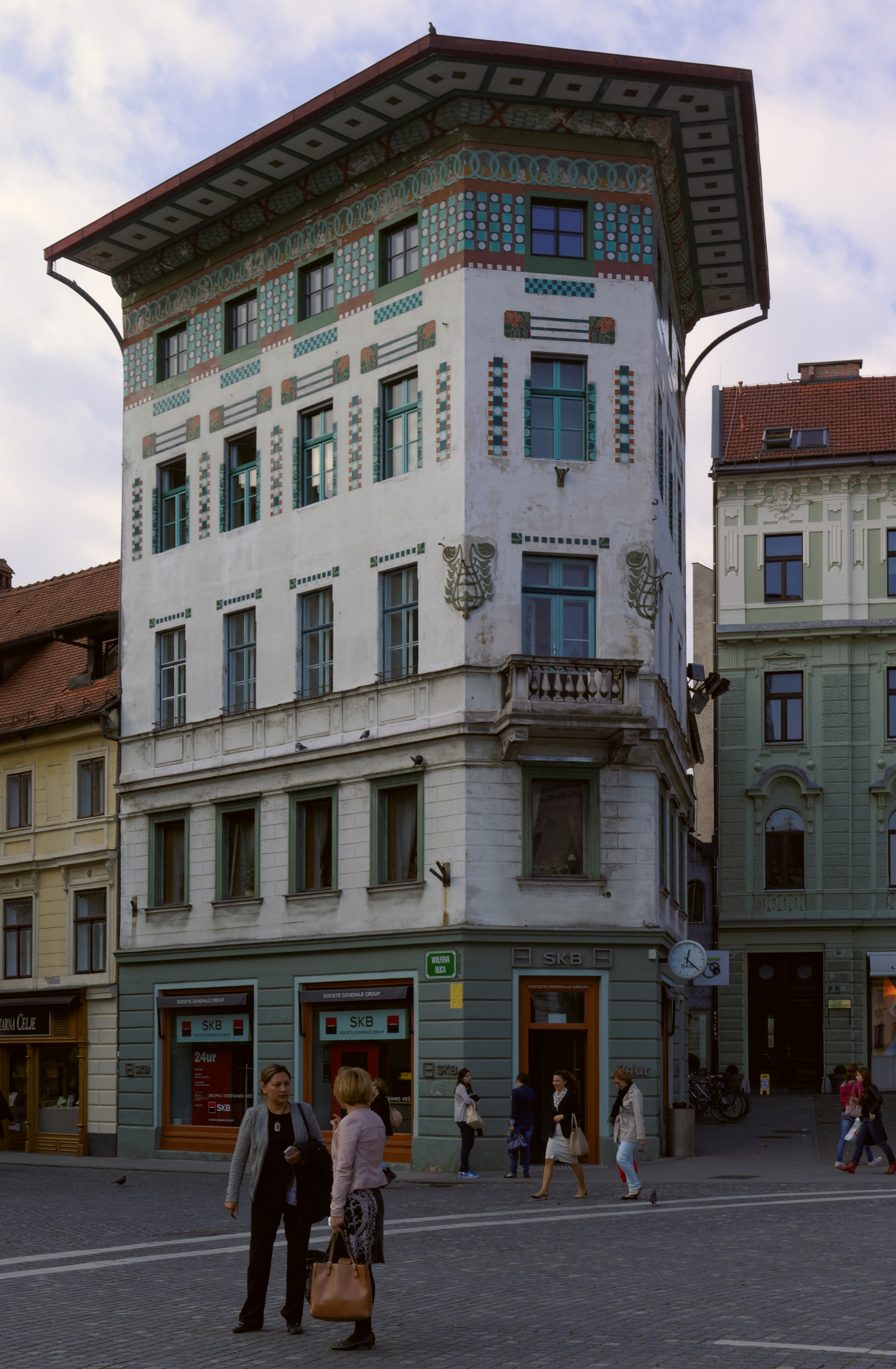
Hauptmann Building (Slovene: Hauptmannova hiša), a.k.a. the Little Skyscraper (Mali nebotičnik), on Ljubljana's Prešeren Square, renovated in the Vienna Secession style by Koch in 1904

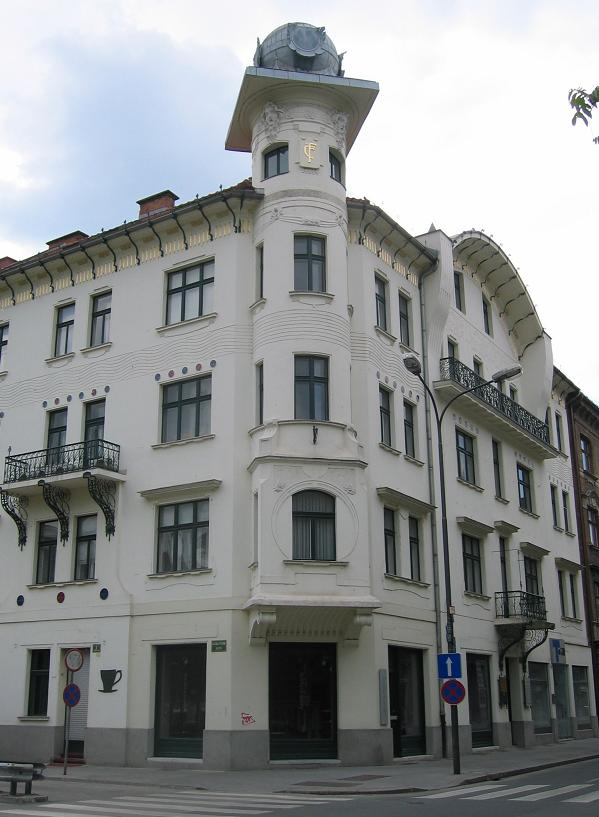
Čuden Building (Čudnova hiša) (1901)

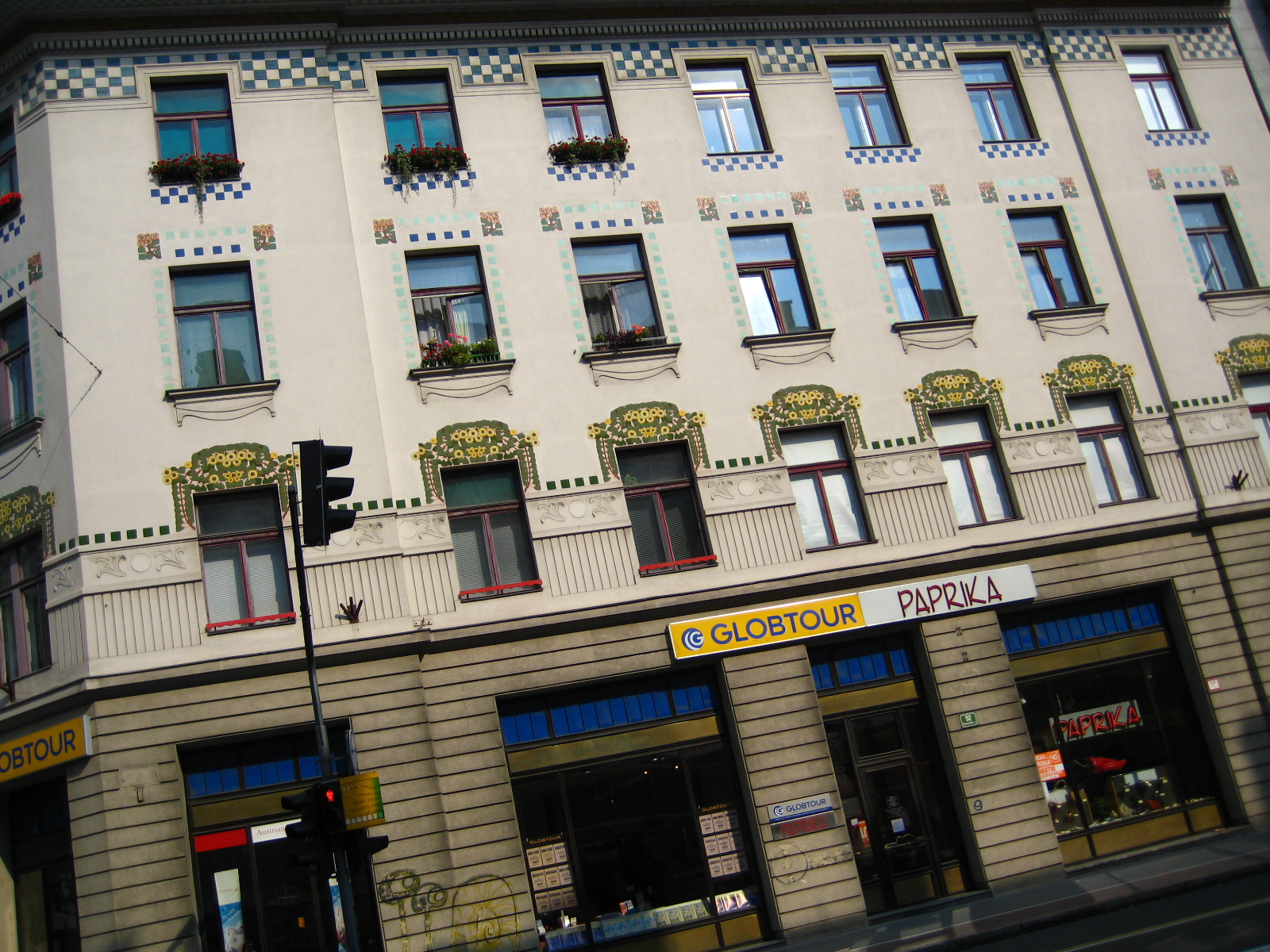
The Farmers Loan Bank (Kmečka posojilnica) (1906–07)

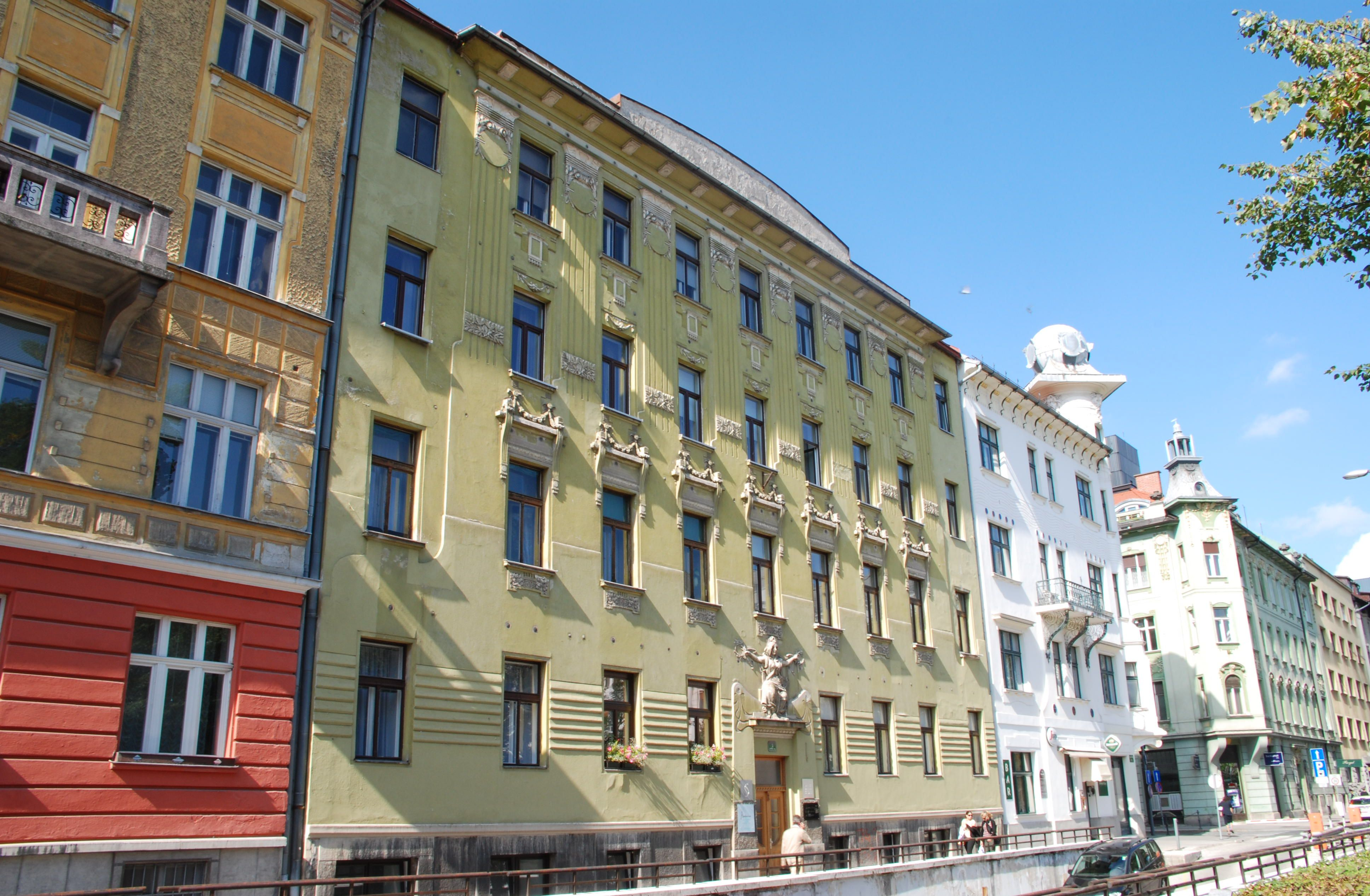
Buildings on Cigale Street (Cigaletova ulica) (1902, 1906)

== Sources ==
- Encyclopedia of Slovene Biography
- Robert Simonišek, The Architecture of Ciril Metod Koch (in Slovene)
