= Helena Kottler Vurnik =

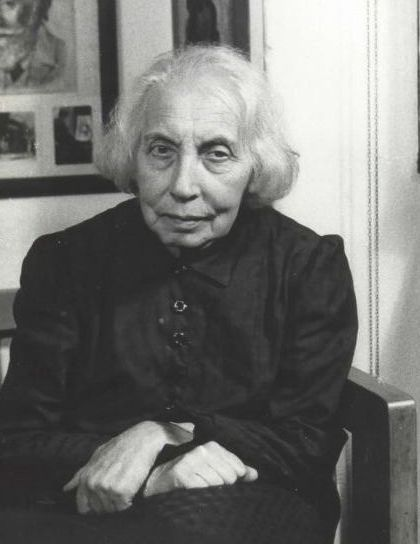
- Helena Kottler Vurnik in 1960
- Born: Helena Kottler; 1882; Vienna, Austria-Hungary
- Died: 1962 (aged 79–80); Ljubljana, SR Slovenia, SFR Yugoslavia
- Education: Vienna School of Arts and Crafts
- Occupations: illustrator, painter, mosaics designer
- Notable work: Cooperative Business Bank facade in Ljubljana
- Spouse: Ivan Vurnik
- Children: -Mira Vurnik -Niko Vurnik (24 January 1923 - April 12, 1942)
- Parents: Moritz Kottler (father); Bronislawa née Trug (mother)

Helena Kottler Vurnik (1882-1962) was a Slovenian artist born in the Austro-Hungarian Empire, best known for decorative paintings on Cooperative Business Bank facade and its interior.

== Life ==
She was born in Vienna to a father Moritz Kottler, a Post Office lawyer, and mother Bronislawa, who was from Poland. She was educated first at 'Graphische Lehr und Versuchsanstalt', then 'Kunstschule für Frauen und Mädchen', and finished Vienna School of Arts and Crafts.

== Work ==
After study in 1910, she won a scholarship to study art in a vicinity of Modena in Italy for five-months. She sold paintings she painted in Italy upon returning to Vienna and she rented an art studio. In 1913, she met her future husband, Ivan Vurnik, while both were drawing salamanders for biologist Franc Megušar at his home. She left her job as an illustrator for 'Illustrirtes Wiener Extrablatt' newspaper, and moved with Ivan Vurnik to work with him first to Trieste, then Ljubljana, and at the end to Radovljica. She created many designs for embroidery for Slovenian churches and sodalities. Embroideries after her designs were made under the lead of the embroiderer Neža Ema Mikec.

== In media and books ==
A script for the documentary film "Iskalca" directed by Alma Lapajne and screened on RTV Slovenia and a book about her and her husband were written by Boris Leskovec.
