= Ivan Vurnik =

Slovene architect

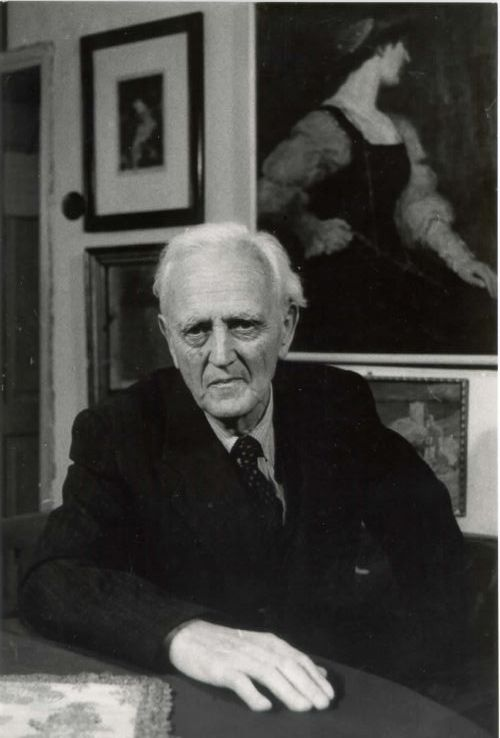
- photo by Ernest Adamič ,1960
- Born: 1 June 1884; Radovljica, Duchy of Carniola, Austria-Hungary
- Died: 8 April 1971 (aged 86); Radovljica, SR Slovenia, SFR Yugoslavia
- Education: Vienna University of Technology
- Occupation: Architect
- Buildings: Cooperative Business Bank

Cooperative Business Bank Building (Ljubljana)

Ivan Vurnik (1 June 1884 – 8 April 1971) was a Slovene architect that helped found the Ljubljana School of Architecture. His early style in the 1920s is associated with the search for Slovene "National Style", inspired by Slovene folk art and the Vienna Secession style of architecture (a type of Art Nouveau). Upon embracing the functionalist approach in the 1930s, Vurnik rivaled the more conservative Plečnik's approach. The Cooperative Business Bank, designed by Vurnik and his wife Helena Kottler Vurnik, who designed the decorative facade in the hues of the Slovene tricolor, has been called the most beautiful building in Ljubljana. Vurnik also created a number of urban plans, among these the plans for Bled (1930), Kranj (1933–1937), and Ljubljana (1935).

== Life ==
Vurnik was born into an artisan's family in the Upper Carniolan town of Radovljica, Austro-Hungarian Empire, present-day Slovenia, and baptized Johann Vurnik. His father was a rather wealthy stonemason, and Vurnik was sent to school first to Kranj and then to Ljubljana.

Vurnik graduated summa cum laude in 1912 from the Vienna University of Technology. He enrolled in 1907 and studied under the supervision of the architect Karl Mayreder. In Vienna he became influenced by the Austrian Art Nouveau style, especially by the work of the fellow Slovenian architect Max Fabiani, with whom he maintained a lifelong friendship. Vurnik received a scholarship and travelled to Italy to study the Italian architecture. He married the Viennese artist Helena Vurnik née Kotler in 1913.

During the First World War he was an Austrian soldier on the Isonzo Front and in Tyrol. In 1917 and 1918 he worked on designing Austrian military graveyards in Aleksinac, Leskovac, and Niš in Serbia. From 1919 onward he lived in Ljubljana.

== Work ==
In October 1912 Vurnik was employed by the Ludwig Baumann. He renovated the interior of the parish church in Bled in the same year and in 1913–15 the bishopric chapel in Trieste.

In the late 1920s he designed the headquarters of the Slovenian Sokol movement, known as Sokol Hall or Tabor Hall.

In 1919 Vurnik established a department of architecture in the Technical Faculty of the University of Ljubljana, and hired the Slovene architect Jože Plečnik as a faculty member.

In 1965, Vurnik renovated the Slovenian national Catholic shrine at Brezje.

== Awards ==
- In 1961, Vurnik was awarded Pechtl Award in Vienna
- In 1966, Vurnik was awarded Prešeren Award in Ljubljana

== In media ==
In 2013, Slovenian National TV broadcast a film, directed by Alma Lapajne, about the Vurnik couple's life story.

== See also ==
- Vladimir Šubic
