= List of bridges in Slovenia =

This list of bridges in Slovenia lists bridges of particular historical, scenic, architectural or engineering interest. Road and railway bridges, viaducts, aqueducts and footbridges are included.

== Historical and architectural interest bridges ==
	Name	Slovene	Distinction	Length	Type	Carries Crosses	Opened	Location	Region	Ref.
1	Napoleon Bridge	Napoleonov most			Masonry; 3 semi-circular arches	Road bridge Soča	1750	Kobarid; 46°14′53.9″N 13°35′10.3″E	Gorizia	
2	Triple Bridge	Tromostovje	Designed by Jože Plečnik; World Heritage Site; National monument		Masonry; 2 segmental arches Arch; Concrete deck arch	Footbridge; Ljubljanica	1842	Ljubljana; 46°03′04.0″N 14°30′22.4″E	Central Slovenia	
3	Borovnica Viaduct	Borovniški viadukt		561 m (1,841 ft)	Masonry; 2 levels, 22 and 25 semi-circular arches	Austrian Southern Railway; Borovnica Valley	1856	Borovnica; 45°55′09.5″N 14°21′52.8″E	Central Slovenia	
4	Hradecky Bridge	Hradeckega most	One of the first hinged arch bridges Registered heritage	33 m (108 ft)	Arch; Cast iron deck arch	Ljubljanica	1867	Ljubljana; 46°02′39.9″N 14°30′20.7″E	Central Slovenia	
5	Dragon Bridge	Zmajski most	Designed by Josef Melan	33 m (108 ft)	Arch; Concrete deck arch	Road bridge Ljubljanica	1901	Ljubljana; 46°03′07.1″N 14°30′37.4″E	Central Slovenia	
6	Solkan Bridge	Solkanski most	One of the largest stone bridge span when inaugurated Span : 85 m (279 ft)	220 m (720 ft)	Masonry; 1 main semi-circular arch	Bohinj Railway; Soča	1906	Nova Gorica; 45°58′43.6″N 13°39′06.6″E	Gorizia	
7	Old Bridge (Maribor)	Stari most			Arch; Steel deck arch	Road bridge Drava	1912	Maribor; 46°33′20.8″N 15°38′45.4″E	Drava	

== Major road and railway bridges ==
This table presents the structures with spans greater than 100 meters (non-exhaustive list).

	Name	Slovene	Span	Length	Type	Carries Crosses	Opened	Location	Region	Ref.
1	Črni Kal Viaduct	Viadukt Črni Kal	141 m (463 ft)(x3)	1,065 m (3,494 ft)	Box girder Prestressed concrete 60+121+3x141+121+75	A1 motorway Osp Valley	2004	Črni Kal; 45°33′20.7″N 13°52′11.3″E	Coastal–Karst	
2	Moste Viaduct	Viadukt Moste	132 m (433 ft)(x2)	444 m (1,457 ft)	Box girder Prestressed concrete 88+2x132+88	A2 motorway European route E61; Sava		Moste; 46°24′27.4″N 14°07′34.4″E	Upper Carniola	
3	Petelinjek Viaduct	Viadukt Petelinjek	130 m (430 ft)(x3)	630 m (2,070 ft)	Box girder Prestressed concrete Twin bridges 90+3x130+90	A1 motorway European route E57; Radomlja		Blagovica; 46°10′34.6″N 14°49′29.4″E	Central Slovenia	
4	Maribor Motorway Bridge	Avtocestni most preko Drave	125 m (410 ft)(x2)	765 m (2,510 ft)	Box girder Prestressed concrete 2x(75+125+75)	A1 motorway European route E59; Drava; Kanal HE Zlatoličje	2009	Maribor; 46°33′12.7″N 15°41′24.7″E	Drava	
5	Koroški most, Maribor	Koroški most	110 m (360 ft)	237 m (778 ft)	Box girder Prestressed concrete 71+110+56	G1-1 road Drava	1996	Maribor; 46°33′36.4″N 15°37′35.7″E	Drava	
6	Peračica Viaduct	Viadukt Peračica	110 m (360 ft)(x2)	370 m (1,210 ft)	Box girder Prestressed concrete Twin bridges 75+2x110+75	A2 motorway European route E61; Peračica	2007; 2011	Ljubno; 46°19′10.8″N 14°14′28.1″E	Upper Carniola	
7	Solkan Road Bridge	Solkanski most	102 m (335 ft)	238 m (781 ft)	Arch; Concrete deck arch	Road bridge Soča	1985	Nova Gorica; 45°58′34.3″N 13°38′51.9″E	Gorizia	
8	Tito Bridge (Maribor)	Titov most	100 m (330 ft)(x3)		Box girder Prestressed concrete 50+100+50	Road bridge Drava	1963	Maribor; 46°33′20.6″N 15°39′02.6″E	Drava	
9	Puch Bridge	Puhov most	100 m (330 ft)(x3)	433 m (1,421 ft)	Extradosed; Concrete box girder deck, 3 concrete pylons 65+3x100+65	G1-2 road Drava	2007	Ptuj; 46°24′46.1″N 15°52′41.7″E	Drava	

== Alphabetical list ==
- Butchers' Bridge (Slovene: Mesarski most) – over the Ljubljanica, in Ljubljana
- Cobblers' Bridge (Čevljarski most) – over the Ljubljanica, in Ljubljana
- Cock Bridge (Ljubljana) (Petelinov most) – over the Gradaščica, in Ljubljana
- Črni Kal Viaduct (Viadukt Črni Kal) – on the A1 motorway above the Osp Valley
- Črnuče Bridge (Črnuški most) – over the Sava, in Ljubljana
- Grain Bridge (Žitni most) – over the Ljubljanica, in Ljubljana
- Dragon Bridge (Ljubljana) (Zmajski most) – over the Ljubljanica, in Ljubljana
- Fužine Bridge (Fužinski most) – over the Ljubljanica, in Ljubljana
- Hradecky Bridge (Hradeckega most) – over the Ljubljanica, in Ljubljana
- Jek Bridge (Jekarski most) – over the Ljubljanica, in Ljubljana
- Kandija Bridge (Kandijski most) – over the Krka, in Novo Mesto
- Kavšek Bridge (Kavškov most) – over the Ljubljanica, in Ljubljana
- Ljubljanica Sluice Gate (Zapornica na Ljubljanici) – over the Ljubljanica, in Ljubljana
- Old Bridge (Stari most) – over the Drava, in Maribor
- Prule Bridge (Prulski most) – over the Ljubljanica, in Ljubljana
- Puh Bridge (Puhov most) – over the Drava, at Ptuj
- Saint James's Bridge (Šentjakobski most) – over the Ljubljanica, in Ljubljana
- Šempeter Bridge (Šempeterski most) – over the Ljubljanica, in Ljubljana
- Solkan Bridge (Solkanski most) – over the Soča, at Solkan
- Triple Bridge (Tromostovje) – over the Ljubljanica, in Ljubljana
- Trnovo Bridge (Trnovski most) – over the Ljubljanica, in Ljubljana

== Notes and references ==
- Nicolas Janberg. "International Database for Civil and Structural Engineering". Structurae.com.
- Others references

== See also ==
- sl:Seznam mostov v Ljubljani (in Slovene) - List of bridges in Ljubljana
- sl:Seznam mostov čez Dravo v Sloveniji (in Slovene) - List of bridges across the Drava in Slovenia
- Transport in Slovenia
- Roads in Slovenia
- Rail transport in Slovenia
- Geography of Slovenia
