= Mačkin Hrib =

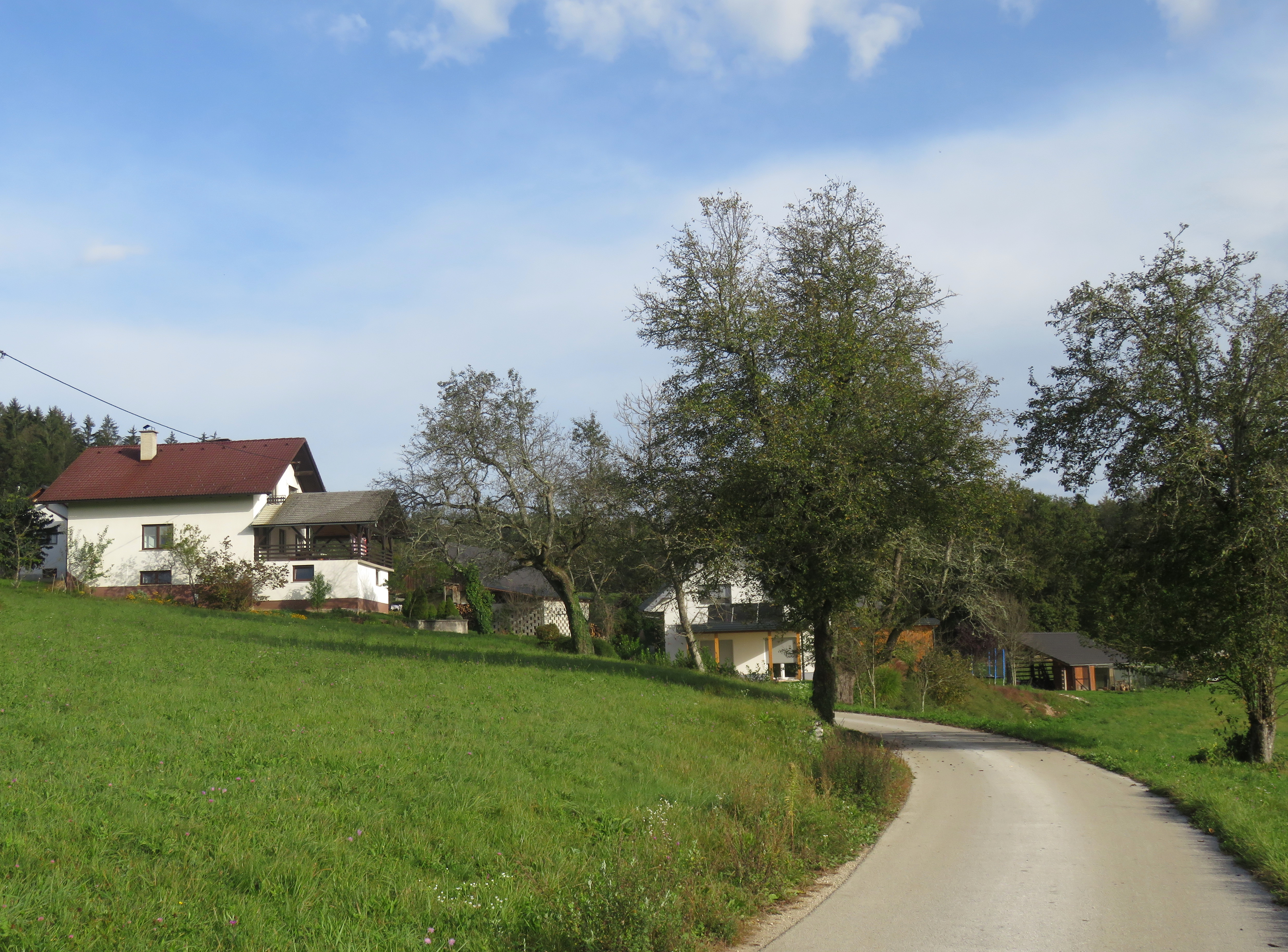

- Location in Slovenia
- Coordinates: 45°49′48″N 14°57′37″E
- Country: Slovenia
- Traditional region: Lower Carniola
- Statistical region: Central Slovenia
- Municipality: Žužemberk
- Elevation: 275 m (902 ft)

Mačkin Hrib (pronounced [ˈmaːtʃkin ˈhɾiːp], in older sources also Mačkni Hrib, Mačji Hrib, or Mačkov Hrib; German: Katzenberg, all meaning 'cat hill') is a formerly independent settlement east of Žužemberk in southeast Slovenia. It is now part of the village of Trebča Vas. It belongs to the Municipality of Žužemberk. It is part of the traditional region of Lower Carniola and is now included with the rest of the municipality in the Southeast Slovenia Statistical Region.

== Geography ==
Mačkin Hrib stands below a small hill north of Trebča Vas.

== History ==
Mačkin Hrib had a population of 15 in three houses in 1870, 20 in four houses in 1880, 25 in four houses in 1890, 22 in four houses in 1900, and 12 in 4 houses in 1931. Mačkin Hrib was annexed by Trebča Vas in 1953, ending its existence as an independent settlement.

== Cultural heritage ==
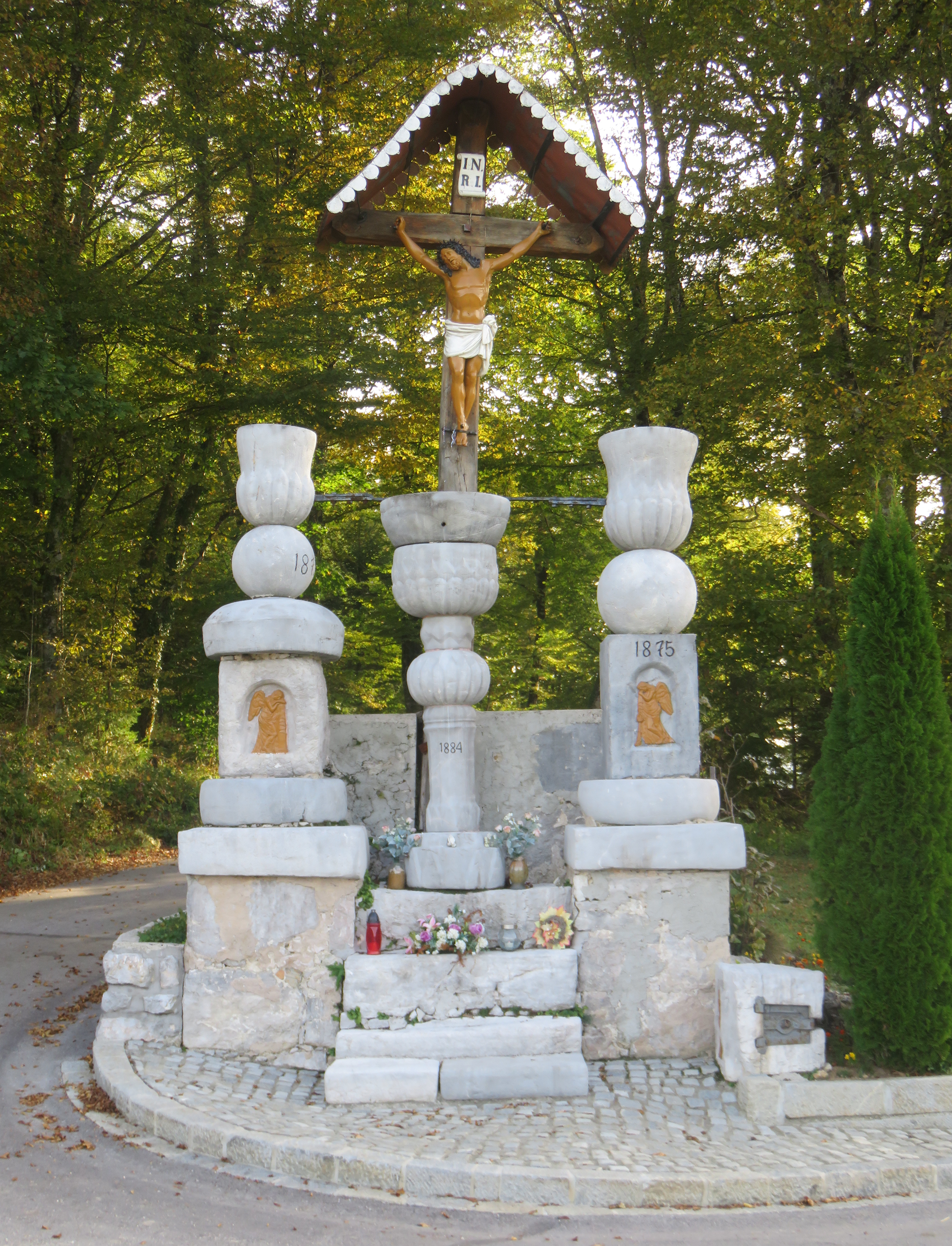
The Naral Shrine

The Naral Shrine (Slovene: Naralovo znamenje), also known as the Naral Cross (Slovene: Naralov križ), stands west of Mačkin Hrib. It was created in the nineteenth century by the local stonecutter Jože Novak after he returned from his military service. The wayside shrine is composed of a wooden cross on a stone plinth with a cast-iron support (from the Auersperg iron foundry in Dvor) and three columns with cup-shaped carvings at the top. The years 1875, 1884, and 1896 are carved into the stone.
