= Drava Bridge =

The Drava Bridge may be:

- Drava Bridge (D41), a bridge in Croatia, located along the D41 road
- Old Bridge (Maribor), a bridge in Maribor, Slovenia
