= Trebča Vas =

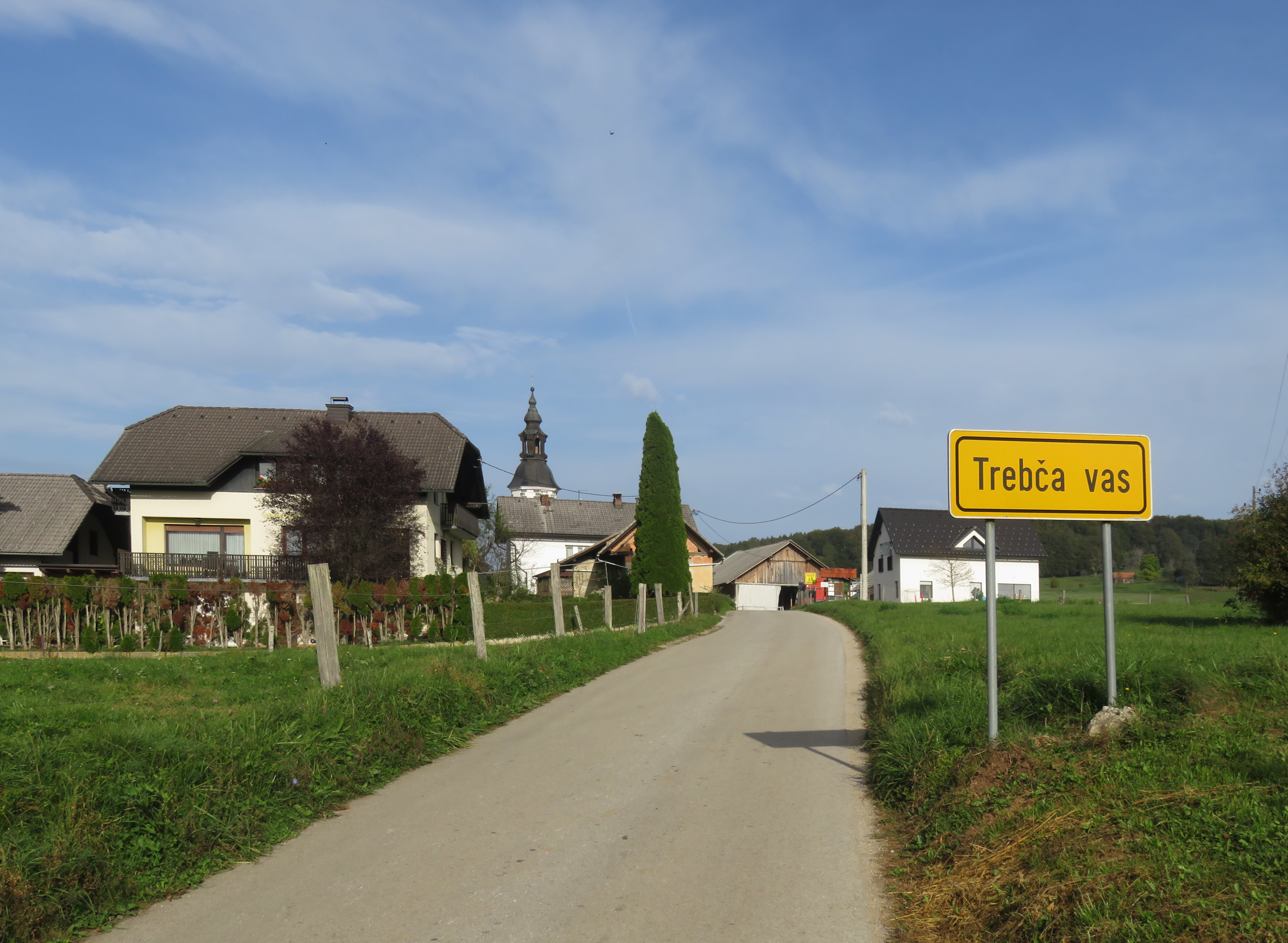

- Location in Slovenia
- Coordinates: 45°49′25.07″N 14°57′27.53″E
- Country: Slovenia
- Traditional region: Lower Carniola
- Statistical region: Southeast Slovenia
- Municipality: Žužemberk

Area
  - Total: 2.7 km^{2} (1.0 sq mi)
- Elevation: 252.4 m (828 ft)

Population (2002)
  - Total: 80

Trebča Vas (pronounced [ˈtɾeːptʃa ˈʋaːs]; Slovene: Trebča vas, German: Triebsdorf) is a village on the left bank of the Krka River in the Municipality of Žužemberk in southeastern Slovenia. The area is part of the historical region of Lower Carniola. The municipality is now included in the Southeast Slovenia Statistical Region. The settlement includes the formerly independent village of Mačkin Hrib (German: Katzenberg).

== Church ==
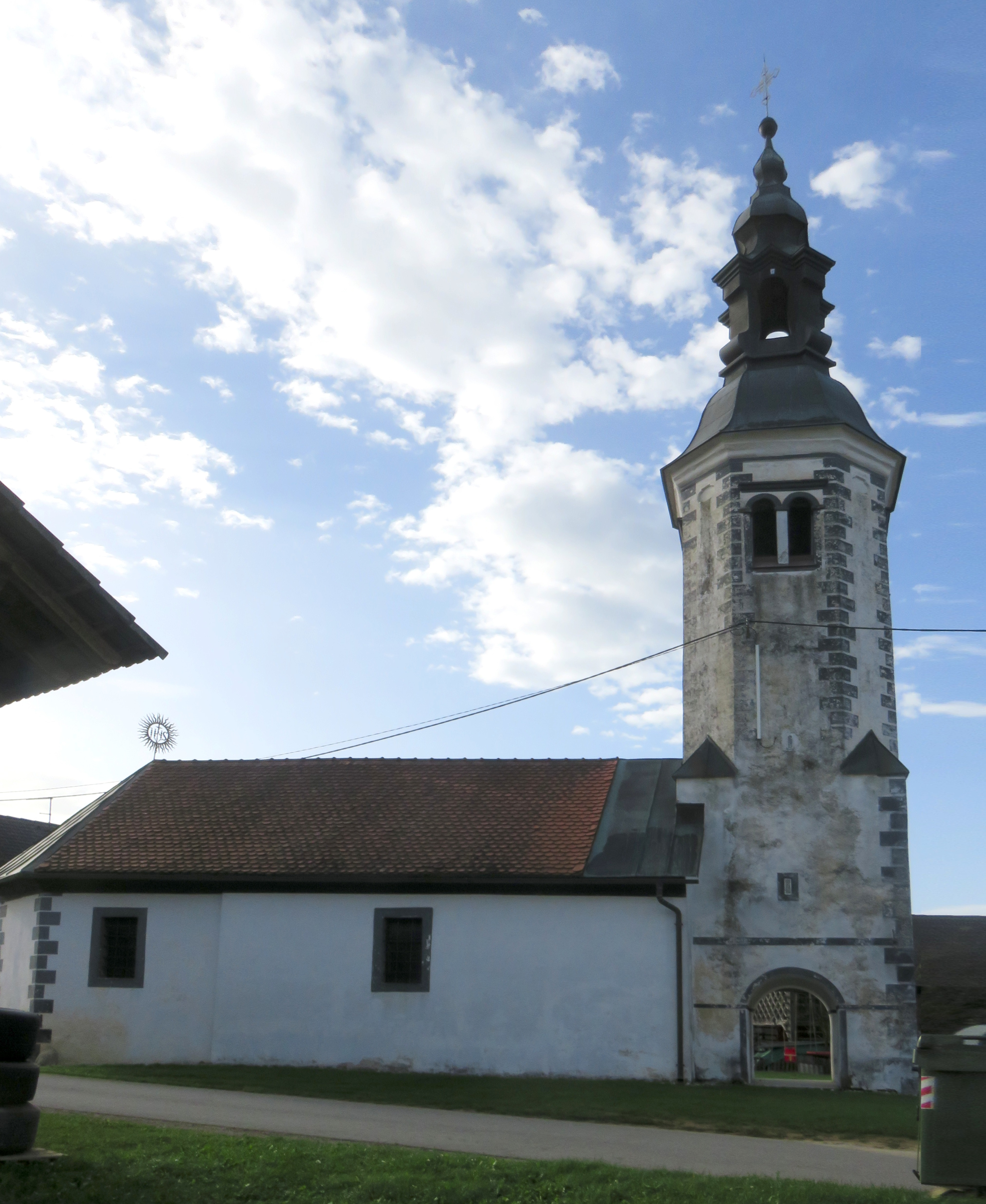
Saint Agathius's Church

The local church is dedicated to Saint Agathius (Slovene: sveti Ahac) and belongs to the Parish of Žužemberk. It is a medieval building that was restyled in the Baroque style in the 17th century.
