= Johann Nepomuk Hradeczky =

Slovene politician (1775–1846)

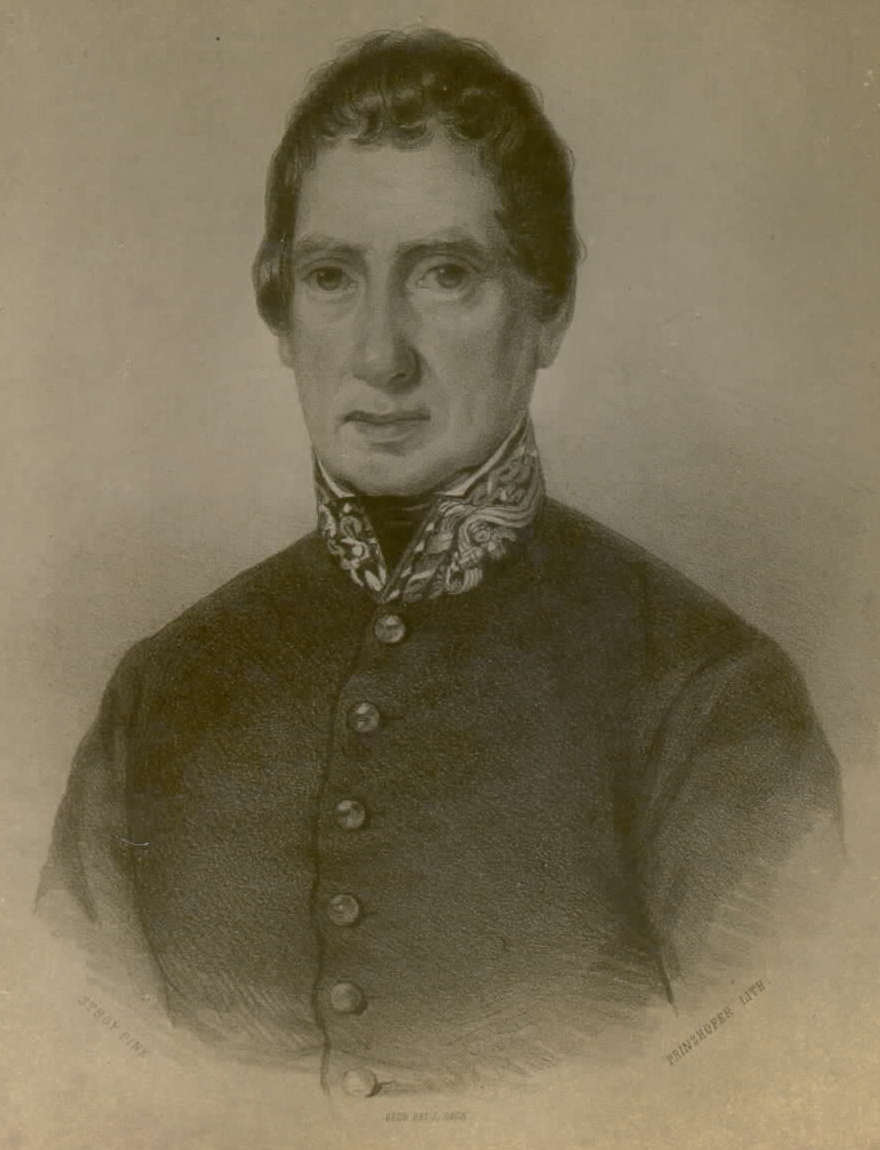
- Born: August 30, 1775; Ljubljana, Holy Roman Empire
- Died: July 6, 1846 (aged 70); Ljubljana, Austrian Empire
- Occupation: Politician

Johann Nepomuk Felix Hradeczky (Slovenized: Janez Nepomuk Hradec(z)ky, in older sources Ivan Nepomuk Hradec(z)ky; (Note: Regarding Hradeczky's surname, Slovene sources vary between the spellings Hradeczky and Hradecky. Regarding his given name, sources often used the abbreviation Joh. Nep. (as on his grave marker); older Slovene sources Slovenized his name as Ivan, and later ones as Janez. His death record reads Johann Nepom. Hradeczky.) August 30, 1775 – July 6, 1846) was an Austrian politician.

== Life ==
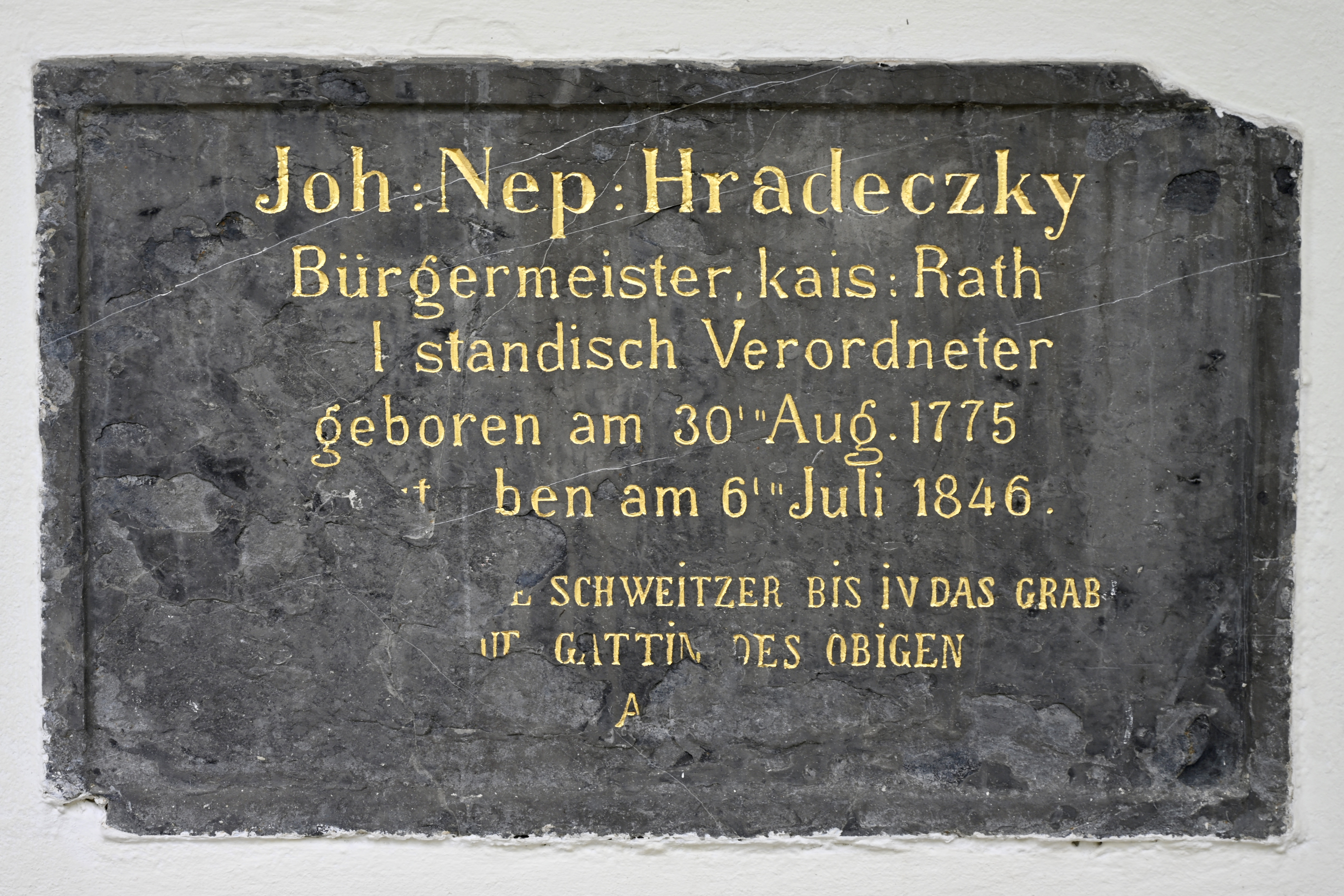
Grave marker of Johann Nepomuk Hradeczky at Navje Memorial Park

Hradeczky was born in Ljubljana (now Slovenia). He served as the mayor of Ljubljana from 1820 until his death. Hradeczky contributed significantly to the development of Ljubljana, and the poet France Prešeren dedicated a sonnet to him.

== Legacy ==
Infrastructure in Ljubljana named after Hradeczky includes Hradeczky Street (Slovene: Hradeckega cesta) in the southeast part of the city and the Hradeczky Bridge (Slovene: Hradeckega most) across the Ljubljanica River.

== Notes ==
Preceded by Johann Nepomuk Rosmann	Mayor of Ljubljana; 1820–1846	Succeeded by Johann Fischer
