= Boris Podrecca =

Slovene-Italian architect and urban designer

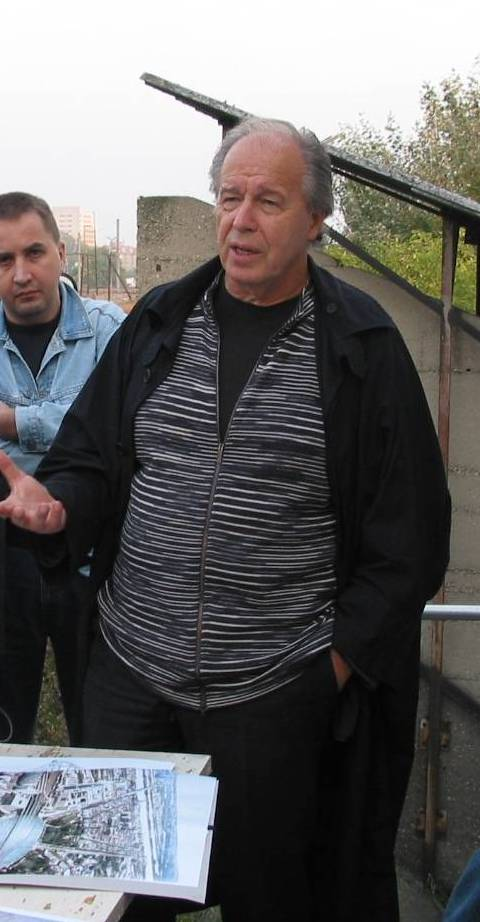
- Born: 30 January 1940 (age 86); Belgrade, Kingdom of Yugoslavia
- Occupations: Architect and urban designer

Boris Podrecca (born 30 January 1940) is a Slovene-Italian architect and urban designer living in Vienna, Austria. Podrecca is considered by some critics a pioneer of postmodernism. He took a new, more tolerant attitude towards historical architectural forms with some of his early works, such as the neuro-physiological institute at Starhemberg Palace (1982),

== Biography ==
He was born in Belgrade, Kingdom of Yugoslavia (now Serbia), to a Slovene father and a Serb mother. His father was a Slovene immigrant from the Italian border region known as Julian March (Venezia Giulia), who had fled to the Kingdom of Yugoslavia to escape persecution from the Italian Fascist regime. His original Slovene surname, Podreka, had been Italianized to Podrecca in the early 1930s. After World War II, the family moved to Trieste, Italy, where Boris attended a Slovene language elementary school.

In the 1960s, he moved to Vienna to study architecture at the TU Wien, where he graduated in 1968 with Professor Roland Rainer. From 1979 to 1981 he worked as an assistant at Technical University of Munich and later, as a guest lecturer at Lausanne, Paris, Venice, Philadelphia, London, Harvard-Cambridge, Boston and Vienna. From 1988 until 2006 he was full professor at the Technical University of Stuttgart and Director of the Institute of Architectural Design and Theory of Space. He is a foreign member of the Serbian Academy of Sciences and Arts.

Boris Podrecca became famous with the exhibition of the work of the architect Carlo Scarpa in the church of Chiesa della Carita at the 1984 Venice Biennale and later the Villes d'Eaux exhibition in Paris. He was also responsible for the exhibition of the work of Jože Plečnik in the Pompidou Centre in Paris (1986). As a leading exhibition designer, he set up the Biedermeier (Vienna, 1987), Bismarck, Prussia, Germany and Europe (Berlin, 1990) and One Hundred Years of Austria exhibitions (1996).

== Main works ==
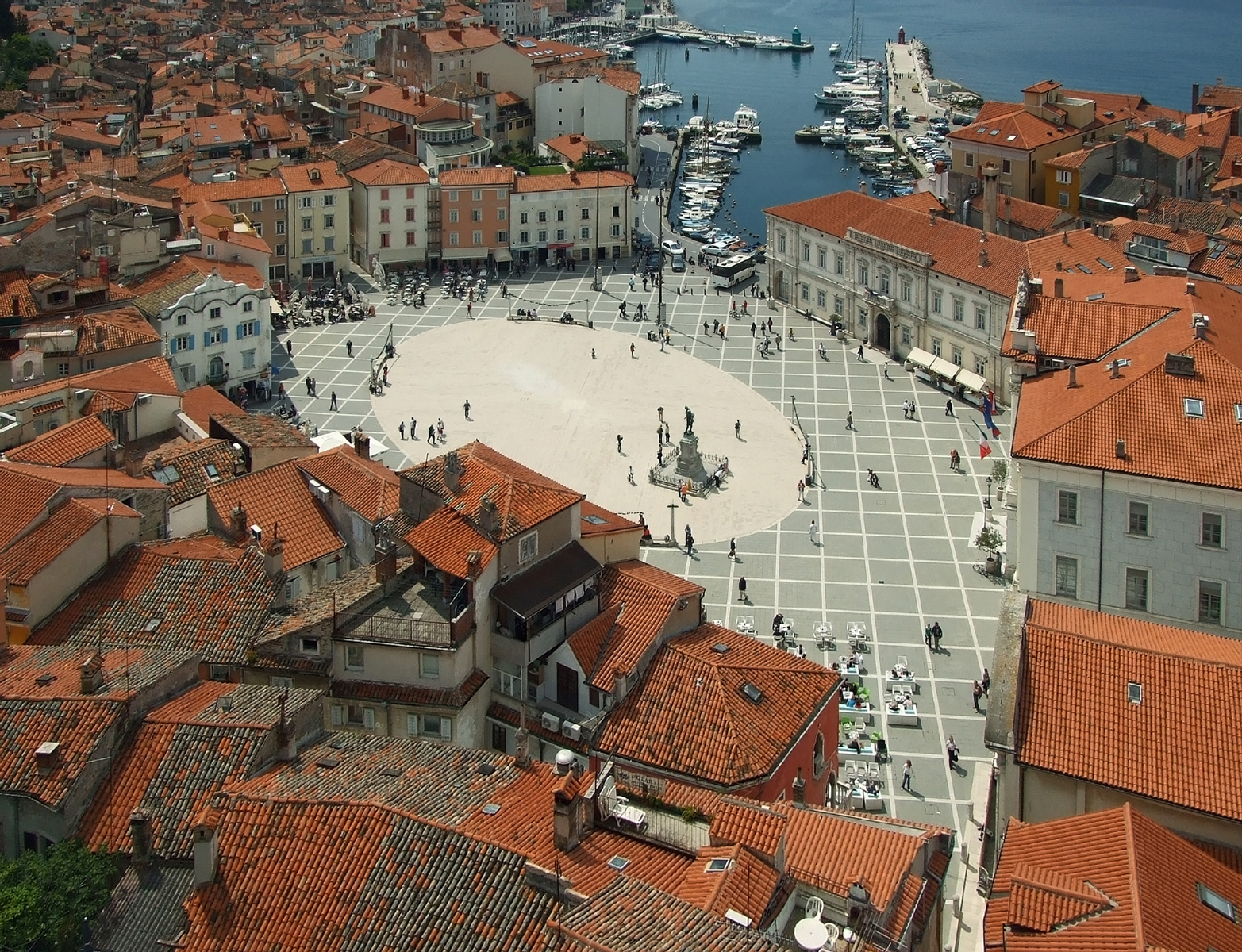
Tartini Square, Piran, Slovenia

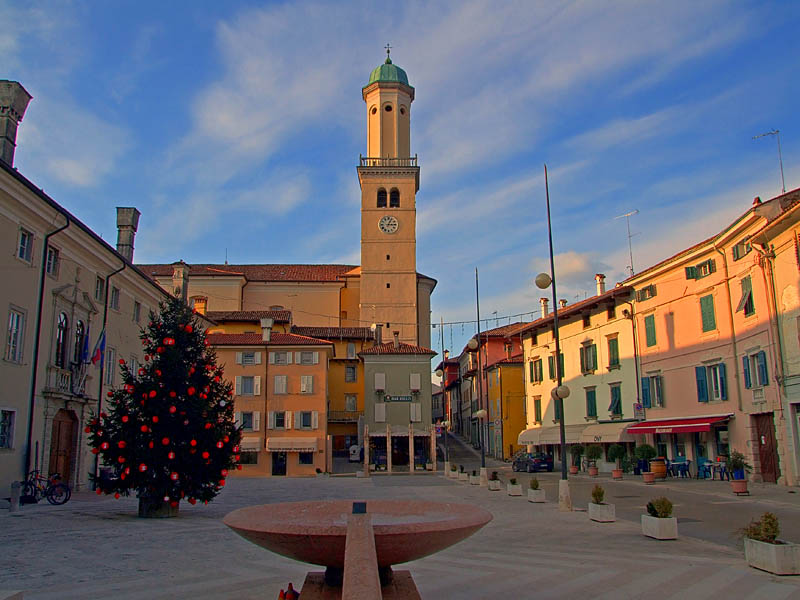
Piazza XXIV Maggio, Cormons, Italy

- Tartini Square, Piran, Slovenia, 1987–1989
- Piazza XXIV Maggio, Cormons, Italy, 1989–1990
- Dirmhirngasse School, Vienna, 1991–1994
- Museum of Modern Art, Ca' Pesaro, Venice, 1992–2002
- Greif-Areal mixed-use development, Bolzano, Italy, 1992–2000
- Judeca Nova Apartments, Giudecca, Venice, 1995–2003
- "In der Wiesen" Social Housing, Vienna, 1996–2000
- Millennium Tower, Handelskai, Vienna, 1997–1999
- Railway Square, Krems an der Donau, Austria, 1997
- Hotel and Conference Centre, Mons, Ljubljana, 2000–2004
- City Square, Motta di Livenza, Italy, 2001–2002
- Praterstern Urban Square, Vienna, 2002–2008
- VBio Center 1, Vienna, 2003–2005
- Skidome und Multi-Functional Center, Garching bei München, Germany, 2005
- Punta Skala Resort, Zadar, Croatia, 2005
- Station San Pasquale, Naples, Italy, 2006
- Šumi Center, Ljubljana, Slovenia, 2006
- Science and Technology Museum, Belgrade, Serbia, 2007
- Civic-Cultural Centre in Ajdovščina, Slovenia, 2010
- Grain Bridge, Ljubljana, 2010
- PP1 project (skyscraper and "city cottages"), Padua, 2010
- Hotel Falkensteiner, Belgrade, Serbia, 2012

== Awards ==
- 1986: Ordre des Arts et des Lettres, Paris
- 1990: Kulturpreis für Architektur, Vienna
- 1992: Jože Plečnik Award, Ljubljana
- 1996: Honorary Member of the Federation of German Architects
- 2000: Honorary degree of the University of Maribor, Slovenia
- 2003: Liberty Award by the President of the Republic of Slovenia
