= Grain Bridge =

Grain Bridge Žitni most
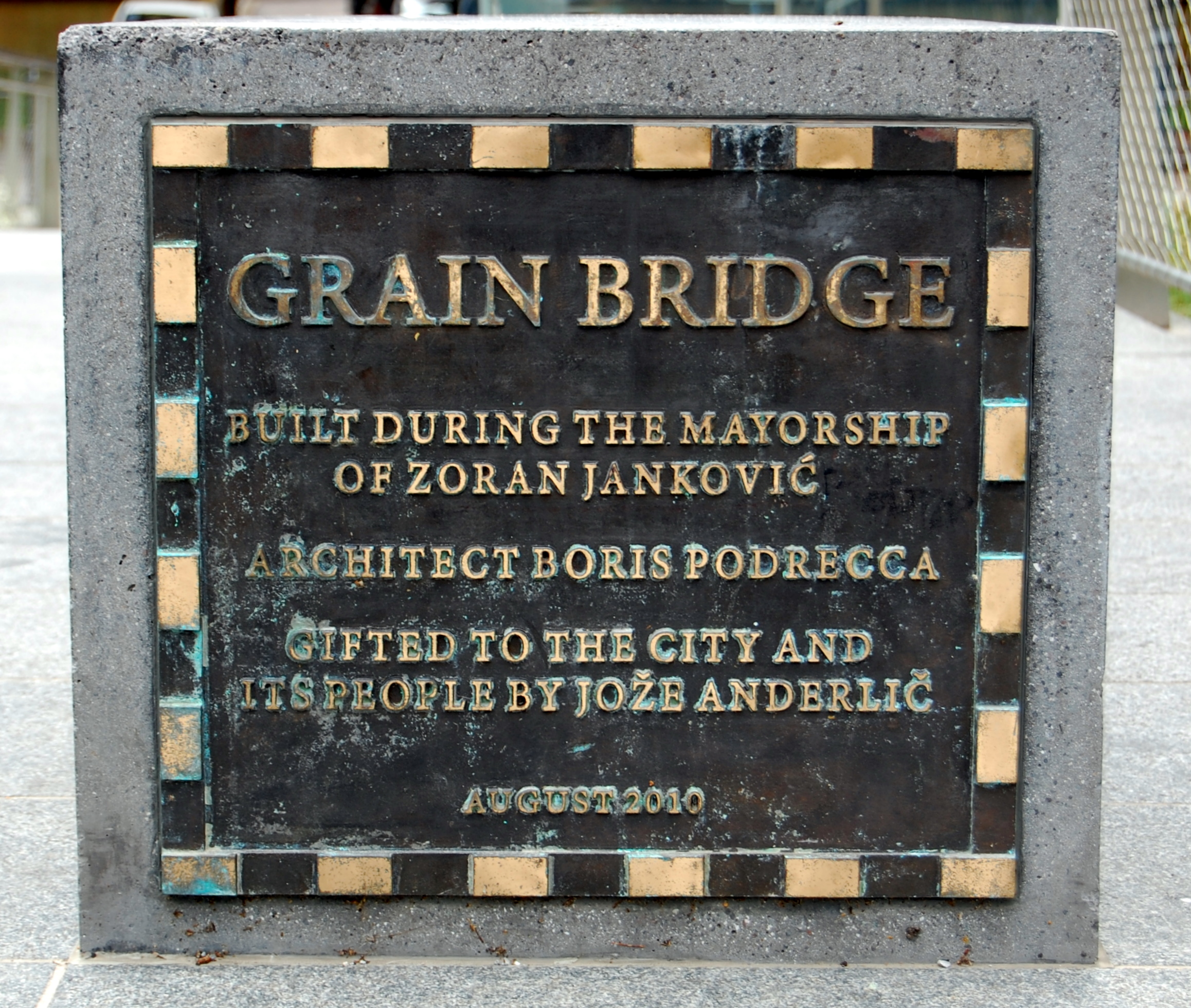
- Commemorative plaque of the Grain Bridge
- Coordinates: 46°03′06″N 14°30′50″E
- Locale: Ljubljana, Slovenia

Characteristics
- Total length: 36m (118 ft)
- Width: 3.8m (12 ft)

History
- Architect: Boris Podrecca
- Built: August 2010

Location
- Interactive map of Grain Bridge

The Grain Bridge (Slovene: Žitni most) is a footbridge over the Ljubljanica River in Ljubljana, the capital of Slovenia. It is located between Tanner Street (Usnjarska ulica) and Gestrin Street (Gestrinova ulica), and links the Petkovšek Embankment (Petkovškovo nabrežje) on the left side of the river and the Poljane Embankment (Poljanski nasip) on its right side. It is used by local residents and students of the Poljane Grammar School and has relieved of pedestrians the St. Peter's Bridge and the Dragon Bridge.

== Name ==
The bridge is named after Grain Square, which is the old name of the nearby Ambrož Square (Ambrožev trg) that was used in the 19th century for grain trade.

== Construction ==
The construction of the bridge took place upon the plans by the architect Boris Podrecca. It was financed by the Mons company, owned by Jože Anderlič. The ceremonial unveiling took place on 24 August 2010. In September 2010, Janez Koželj, a professor of urban design and a vice-mayor of the City Municipality of Ljubljana, described the bridge as an "exceptionally beautiful art work".

=== Specifications and features of the bridge ===
The bridge is 36 metres (118 ft) long and 3.8 m (12 ft) wide. It is paved with tonalite plates. In its central part its walking surface widens and a lookout platform with banks has been placed there. In the center of the bridge a plaque has been placed with the inscription "Grain Bridge. Built during the mayorship of Zoran Janković. Architect Boris Podrecca. Gifted to the city and its people by Jože Anderlič. August 2010."
