= Črnuče Bridge =

Bridge in Ljubljana, Slovenia

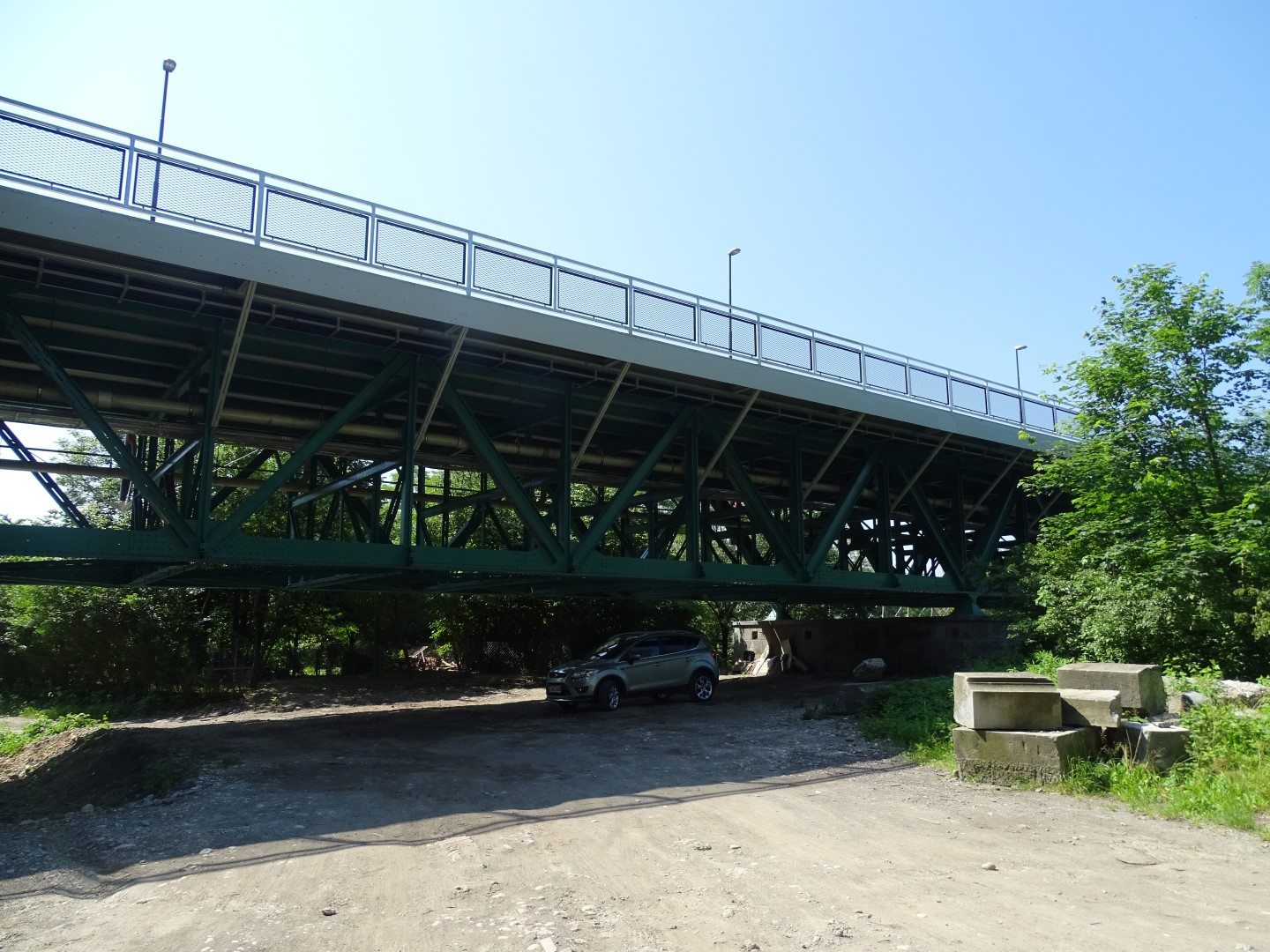
- The Črnuče Bridge as visible from the footpath below
- Coordinates: 46°06′N 14°31′E
- Crosses: Sava River
- Locale: Ljubljana, Slovenia

History
- Built: 1906

Location
- Interactive map of Črnuče Bridge

The Črnuče Road Bridge (Slovene: Črnuški cestni most) is a road bridge crossing the Sava River in Črnuče, a district of Ljubljana, the capital of Slovenia. The bridge, which dates to 1906, is 143 metres (469 ft) long. It forms part of the Vienna Road (Dunajska cesta), a main road artery of Ljubljana, and is used by local bus lines Nos. 6, 8, and 21. The bridge was for the last time renovated in 2014. Downstream of the road bridge runs the Črnuče Railway Bridge (Slovene: Črnuški železniški most) with a metal framed structure. Its construction took place as part of the project to connect by railway the towns of Ljubljana and Kamnik, and it was completed in 1891. This bridge was demolished in 1945, during World War II, but was then rebuilt.

== History ==
The first bridge on the site was a Roman bridge built 50–80 metres upstream of the current location. It was part of the road connecting the towns of Emona and Celeia. As per estimates, it was 8 m (26 ft) wide, 300 m (980 ft) long, and rested on twenty-six piers. After the collapse of the Roman Empire in the 5th century, it was abandoned and came to ruins, until it was rediscovered in 1901 by the engineer Stanko Bloudek.

In 1724, after a significant increase in transport between Vienna and Trieste, a new wooden bridge was built across the Sava in Črnuče. It was used by teamsters who transported flour, sand, and silt, and was also crucial for Ljubljana's food supply.

During World War II, the Sava constituted the border between Italy and Germany, and the road bridge was a checkpoint between the two countries. There are some remains from the period next to the bridge, such as a German and an Italian bunker on the banks of the river.
