= Prule Bridge =

Bridge in Slovenia

Coordinates: 46°2′29.48″N 14°30′33.84″E

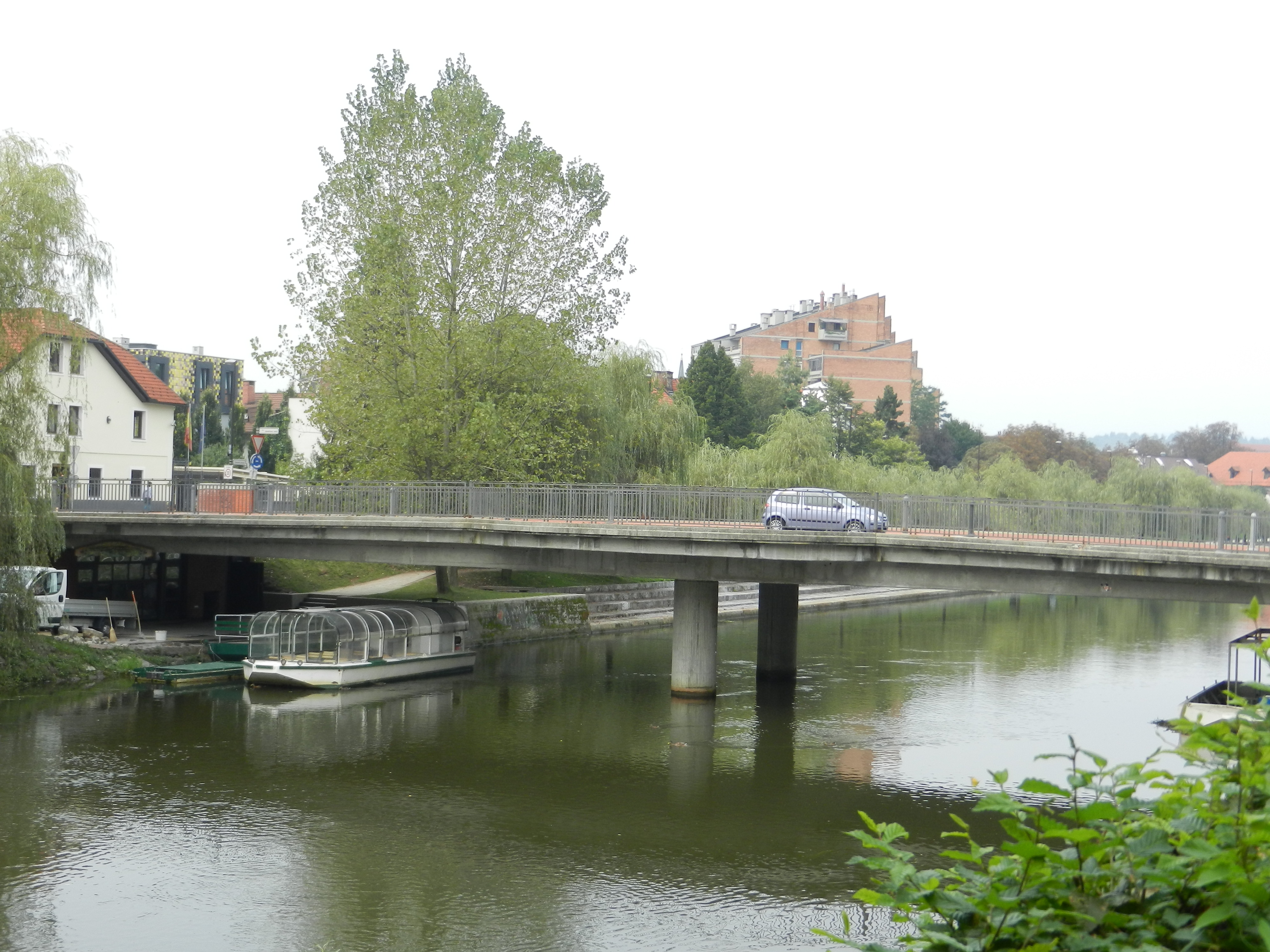
The Prule Bridge

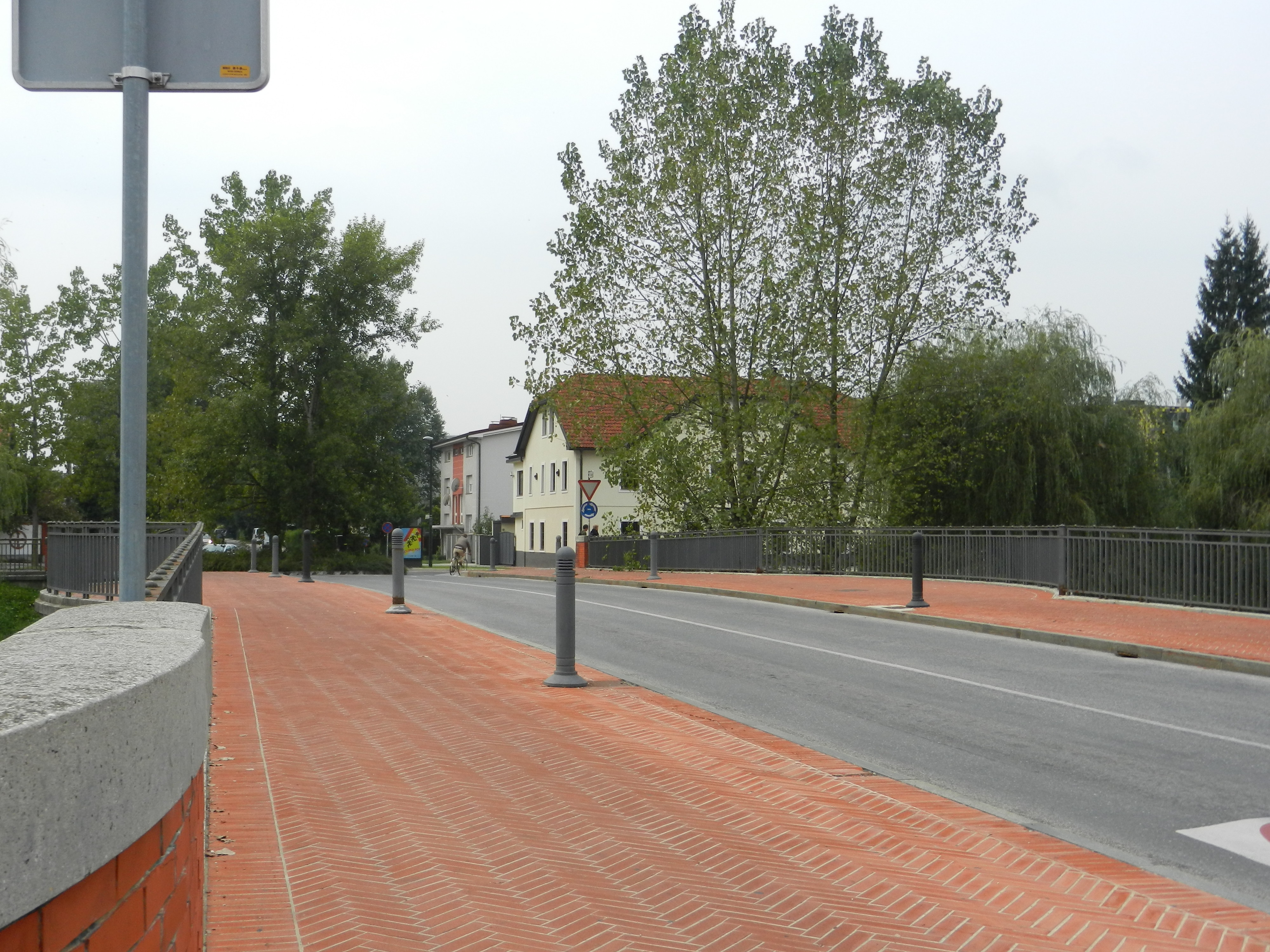
The platform of the Prule Bridge

The Prule Bridge (Slovene: Prulski most) or the Brickmakers' Bridge (Opekarski most) is a bridge crossing the Ljubljanica River in Ljubljana, the capital of Slovenia. It is located in the Trnovo District to the south of the Ljubljana old town and links the residential districts of Prule (Janežič Street; Slovene: Janežičeva cesta) and Trnovo (Brickmakers' Street; Slovene: Opekarska cesta). It is shaped like a wide platform on two columns with lookout balconies and with wide pavements, covered with red brick.

The first bridge at the site was a wooden one, previously used as the St. Peter's Bridge, and was transferred here around 1918. On the left bank, Jože Plečnik embellished the otherwise insignificant bridge with three poplars. The current bridge was built in 1993 based on plans by Peter Gabrijelčič. It is a compromise between the city government that wanted to build a four-lane bridge and residents who wanted a footbridge.
