= Cobblers' Bridge =

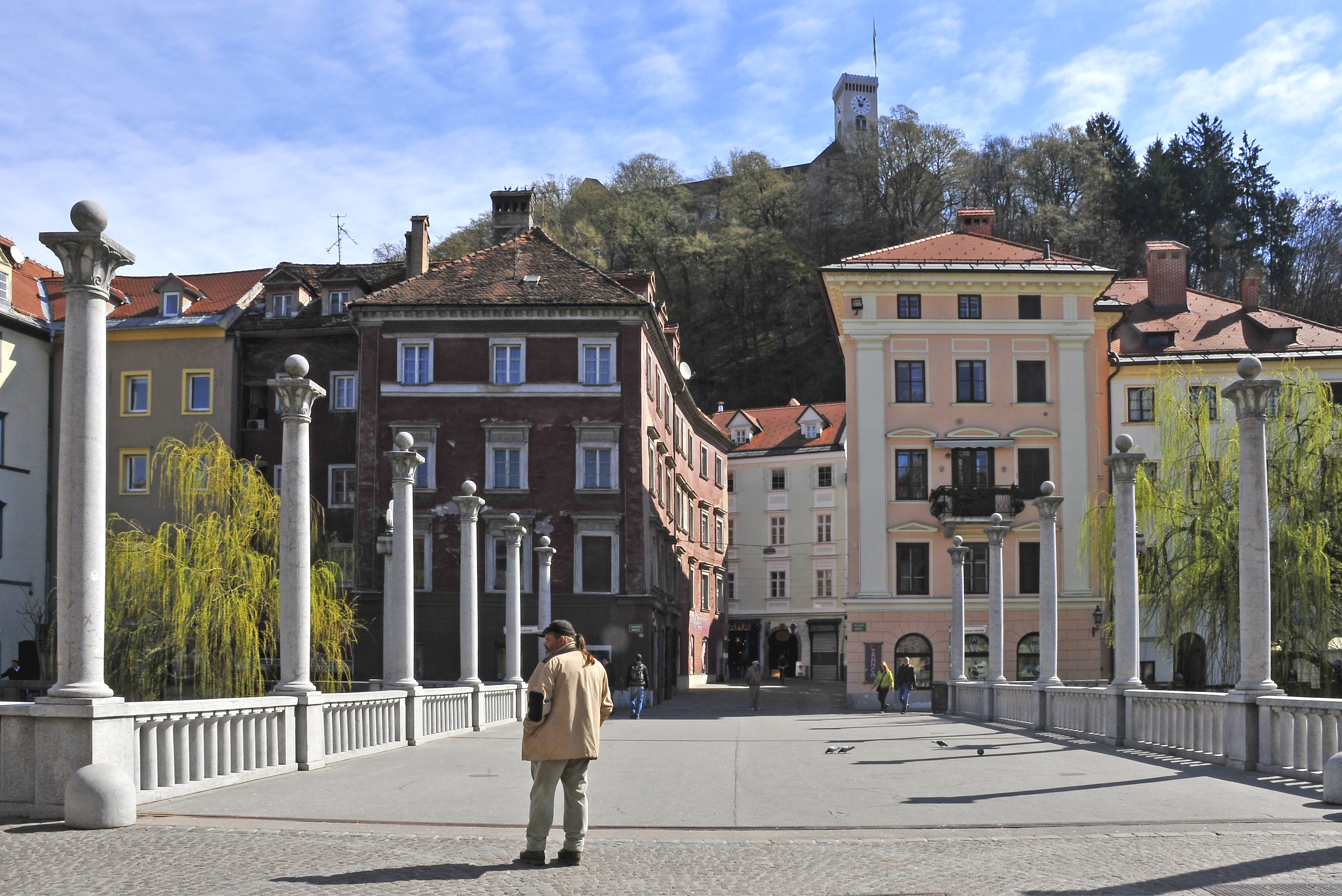
- Coordinates: 46°02′53″N 14°30′22″E
- Crosses: Ljubljanica River
- Locale: Ljubljana, Slovenia

Characteristics
- Design: Arch bridge

History
- Opened: 1931

The Cobblers' Bridge or the Shoemakers' Bridge (Slovene: Čevljarski most or Šuštarski most) is a pedestrian bridge crossing the river Ljubljanica in Ljubljana, the capital of Slovenia. It connects two major areas of medieval Ljubljana. It is decorated by two kinds of pillars, the Corinthian pillars which delineate the shape of the bridge itself and the Ionic pillars as lamp-bearers. Built upon the plans by the architect Jože Plečnik, it was inscribed in August 2021 as part of Plečnik's legacy on the UNESCO World Heritage List.

== History ==
It is one of the oldest bridges crossing the river in Ljubljana and dates back to at least the 13th century. In the Middle Ages, it was known as the Upper Bridge (Zgornji most). It started as a wooden bridge with a butchers shop on it, but the stench from the meat was so strong that the Emperor at the time paid to have them relocated. Shoemakers were the new occupiers of their booths, so the bridge gained its present name. The bridge has been reconstructed on numerous occasions throughout its long history due to floods or fires, and in 1867 a cast-iron bridge, named Hradecky Bridge after a former mayor of Ljubljana, was built and later relocated. The current stone bridge was designed in 1931 by the architect Jože Plečnik. In 2010, a monument of Ivan Hribar, mayor of Ljubljana between 1895 and 1907, was unveiled next to the bridge. The current stone bridge was built in 1931.
