= Fužine Bridge =

Fužine Bridge Fužinski most
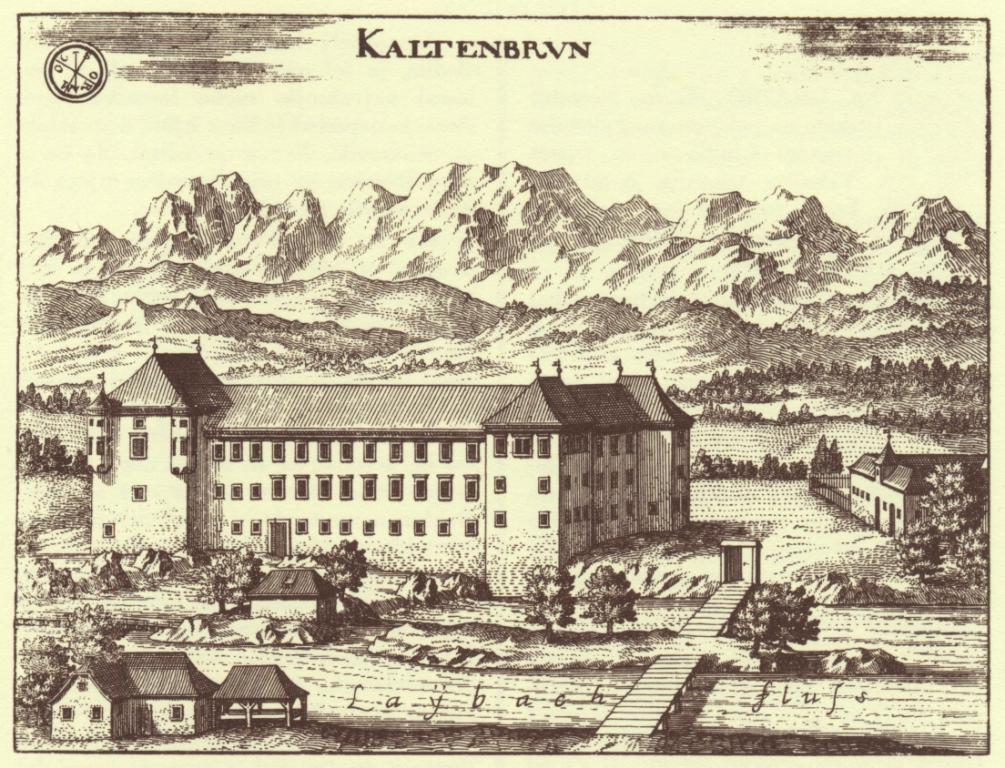
- Fužine Bridge
- Coordinates: 46.049620°N 14.564486°E
- Crosses: Ljubljanica
- Locale: Ljubljana

History
- Construction end: 1987

The Fužine Bridge (Slovene: Fužinski most) is a bridge crossing the Ljubljanica River near Fužine Castle in the eastern part of Ljubljana, the capital of Slovenia. It was built in 1987 based on plans by Peter Gabrijelčič, who received the Prešeren Fund Award for it in 1988. It was modelled on bridges by Jože Plečnik.
