= Dvor, Žužemberk =

Dvor
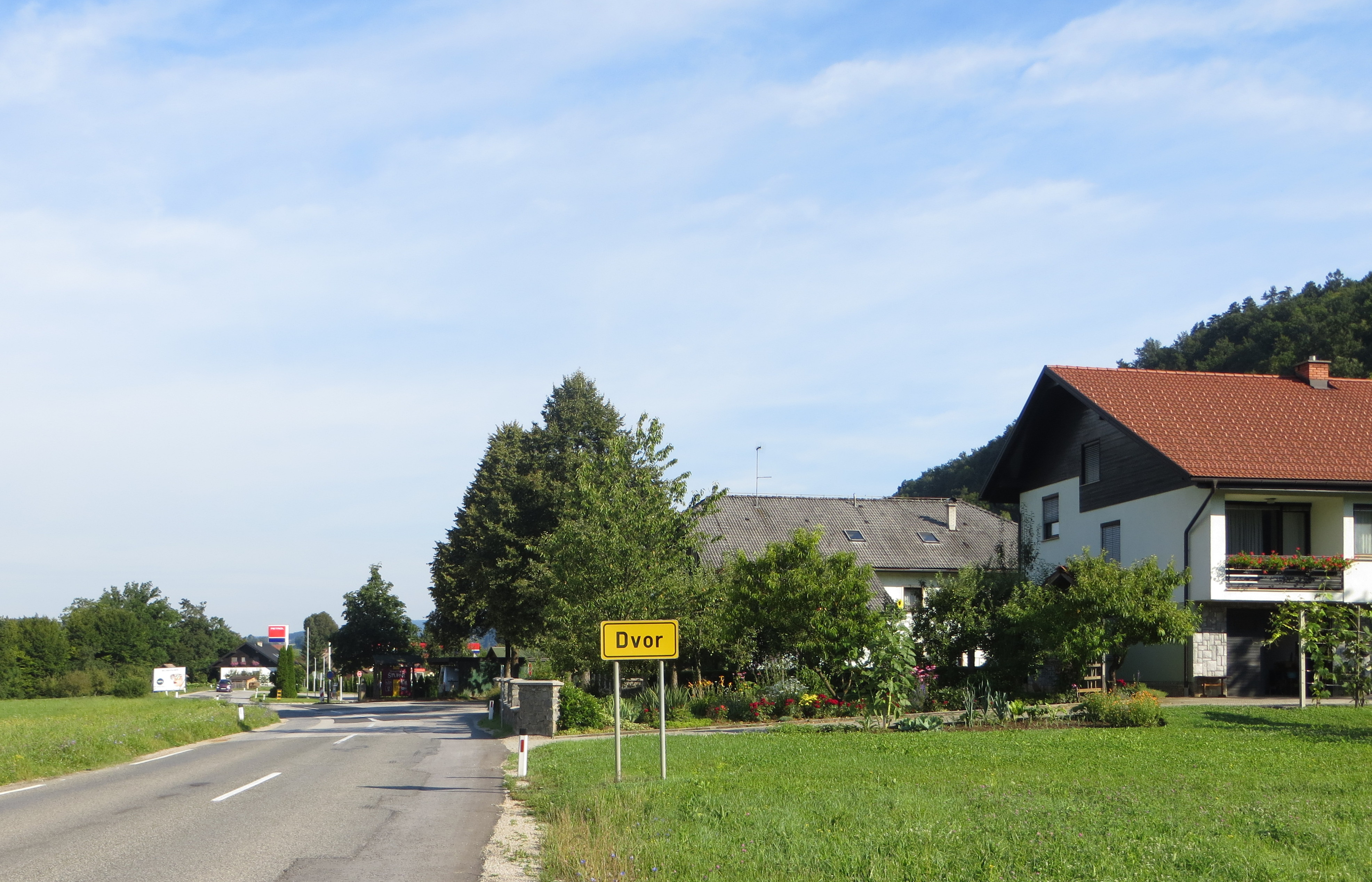

- Location in Slovenia
- Coordinates: 45°48′34.87″N 14°57′56.75″E
- Country: Slovenia
- Traditional region: Lower Carniola
- Statistical region: Southeast Slovenia
- Municipality: Žužemberk

Area
  - Total: 1.02 km^{2} (0.39 sq mi)
- Elevation: 196.6 m (645 ft)

Population (2002)
  - Total: 389

Dvor (pronounced [ˈdʋɔɾ], German: Hof) is a village on the right bank of the Krka River in the Municipality of Žužemberk in southeastern Slovenia. The area is part of the historical region of Lower Carniola. The municipality is now included in the Southeast Slovenia Statistical Region.

== Church ==
The local church was dedicated to Saint George (Slovene: sveti Jurij) and was a medieval building that was heavily damaged during the Second World War when it was hit by an allied bomb on Easter Sunday, 1945. After the war the ruins of the church were totally removed.

== Iron foundry ==
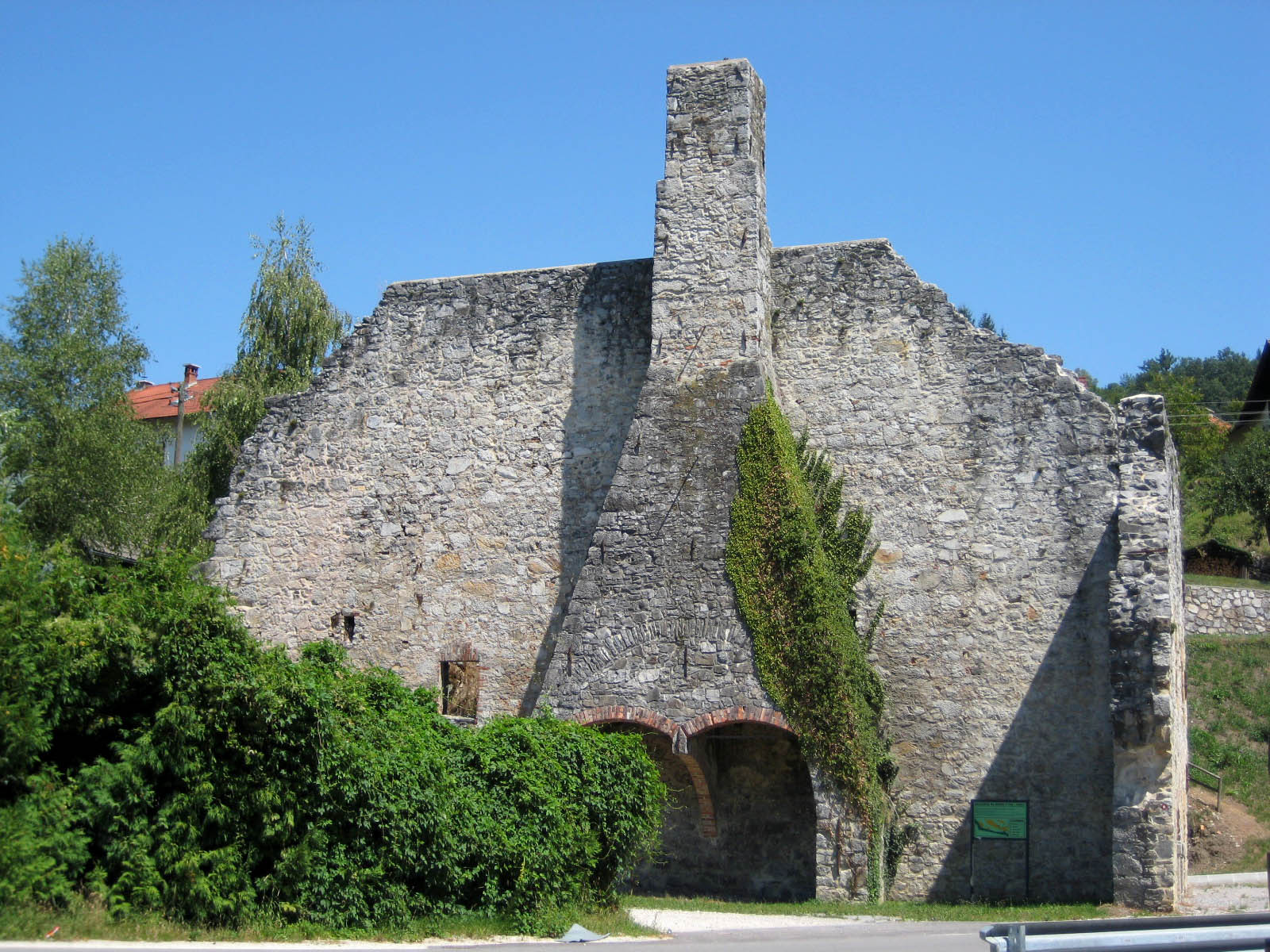
Remains of the Auersperg iron foundry in Dvor today

The Auersperg iron foundry, one of the largest to the south of the Alps and one of the largest early manufacturing plants in the Slovene Lands, operated in Dvor from 1796 to 1891. It produced a wide variety of cast iron and wrought iron products. Examples of its work are the Hradecky Bridge in Ljubljana, the boot jack depicted on a Slovenian post stamp in November 1998, and the cast-iron columns that were placed at the platforms of the Austrian Southern Railway. The artistic castings from the foundry are the first specimens of industrial design in the Slovene lands.

== Geography ==
=== Climate ===
Dvor has a temperate oceanic climate (Köppen: Cfb).

Climate data for Dvor (204m elev.) [1948-2022]
| Month | Jan | Feb | Mar | Apr | May | Jun | Jul | Aug | Sep | Oct | Nov | Dec | Year |
|---|---|---|---|---|---|---|---|---|---|---|---|---|---|
| Average precipitation mm (inches) | 66.75 (2.63) | 71.1 (2.80) | 72.76 (2.86) | 93.85 (3.69) | 106.94 (4.21) | 128.0 (5.04) | 120.26 (4.73) | 117.67 (4.63) | 123.72 (4.87) | 119.49 (4.70) | 118.08 (4.65) | 87.5 (3.44) | 1,226.12 (48.25) |
| Average extreme snow depth cm (inches) | 21.61 (8.51) | 22.35 (8.80) | 14.44 (5.69) | 3.82 (1.50) | 3.57 (1.41) | 0.0 (0.0) | 0.0 (0.0) | 0.0 (0.0) | 0.0 (0.0) | 3.0 (1.2) | 12.9 (5.1) | 16.58 (6.53) | 22.35 (8.80) |
| Average precipitation days (≥ 0.1 mm) | 11.06 | 10.77 | 11.07 | 13.15 | 13.78 | 13.55 | 11.32 | 10.57 | 10.26 | 10.97 | 12.39 | 12.0 | 140.89 |
| Average rainy days (≥ 0.1 mm) | 6.13 | 5.97 | 8.84 | 12.63 | 13.59 | 13.53 | 11.32 | 10.55 | 10.26 | 10.73 | 10.8 | 7.99 | 122.34 |
| Average snowy days (≥ 0.1 mm) | 5.2 | 4.93 | 3.09 | 0.79 | 0.04 | 0.0 | 0.0 | 0.0 | 0.0 | 0.07 | 1.84 | 4.5 | 20.46 |
Source: National Meteorological Service of Slovenia – Archive
