= Hradecky Bridge =

Bridge in Ljubljana, Slovenia

Hradecky Bridge, Mortuary Bridge
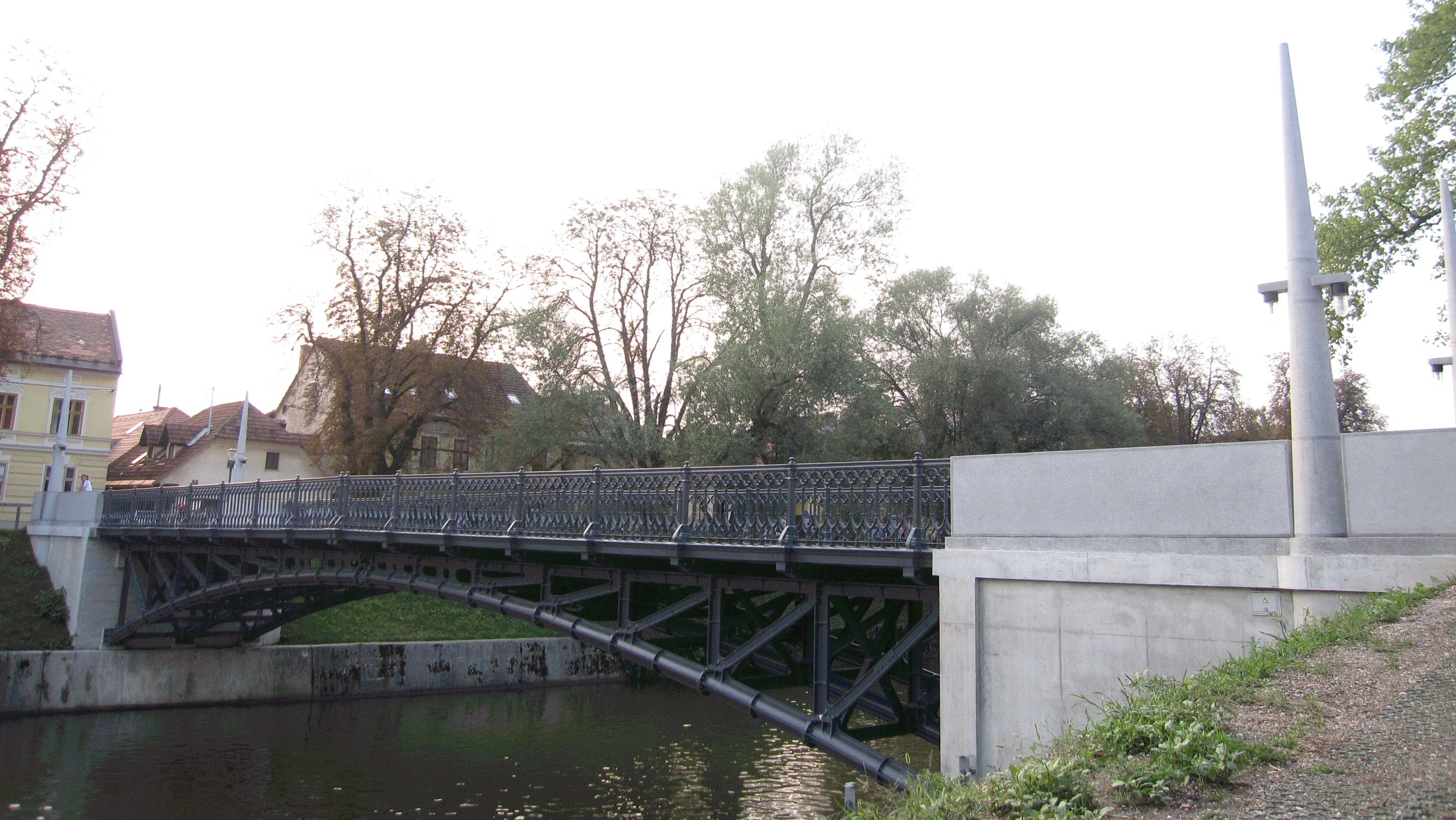
- The Hradecky Bridge at its current location in Trnovo
- Coordinates: 46°02′40″N 14°30′21″E
- Crosses: Ljubljanica River
- Locale: Ljubljana, Slovenia

Characteristics
- Design: Cast iron arch bridge
- Total length: 30.8 metres (101 ft)
- Width: 6.42 metres (21.1 ft)

History
- Opened: 18 October 1867

Location
- Interactive map of Hradecky Bridge, Mortuary Bridge

The Hradecky Bridge (Slovene: Hradeckega most) is a footbridge spanning the Ljubljanica River in Ljubljana, the capital of Slovenia. It connects Hrenova Street in the Trnovo District with the Prule neighbourhood of the Center District.

One of the first hinged arch bridges in the world, and the first (and only preserved) cast iron bridge in Slovenia, it was praised as a technical achievement at its construction in 1867, as well as for its elegance, modernity, and cost-effectiveness. The bridge's modular construction has made it relatively easy to relocate, and it has been moved twice. By virtue of its location on the route used to transport decedents from Ljubljana's main hospital to the city mortuary (between 1931 and 2010), it gained the somber nickname "Bridge of the Dead" (Mrtvaški most), which remains in colloquial use.

The bridge was manufactured according to the plans of engineer Johann Hermann from Vienna at the Auersperg iron foundry in Dvor near Žužemberk, and was installed as the first cast iron bridge in Ljubljana in 1867, replacing the wooden Cobblers' Bridge. It has three articulated arches, each of them made of two sections joined by a bolt at the highest point of the arch. The elements are joined with screws instead of wedges, and reinforcing bars and hollow elements were used instead of full pylons, which enable the bridge to be much lighter while remaining stable. The design represents several major technical advancements over the first generation of cast-iron bridges, such as the 1781 Iron Bridge across the Severn in England.

The bridge was officially named after 1820-1846 Ljubljana mayor Johann Nepomuk Hradeczky, but was (at its original location) commonly known as the Cobblers' Bridge. In 1931, the architect Jože Plečnik designed the current iteration of the Cobblers' Bridge, moving the Hradecky Bridge further down the Ljubljanica to a site near the former Ljubljana mortuary on Zaloška Street, at which point he also replaced the original gas lamps at its corners with Secession-style concrete spires housing electric street-lamps. In 2004, the bridge (which had never been intended for motor vehicles) was determined to be unsafe and was closed to all traffic, with a temporary footbridge built alongside it in 2009. In 2010, the bridge was dismantled, renovated, and transferred to its current site, connecting the Krakovo Embankment (Krakovski nasip) and the Gruden Embankment (Grudnovo nabrežje). It reopened in 2011 as a footbridge for pedestrians and cyclists only.

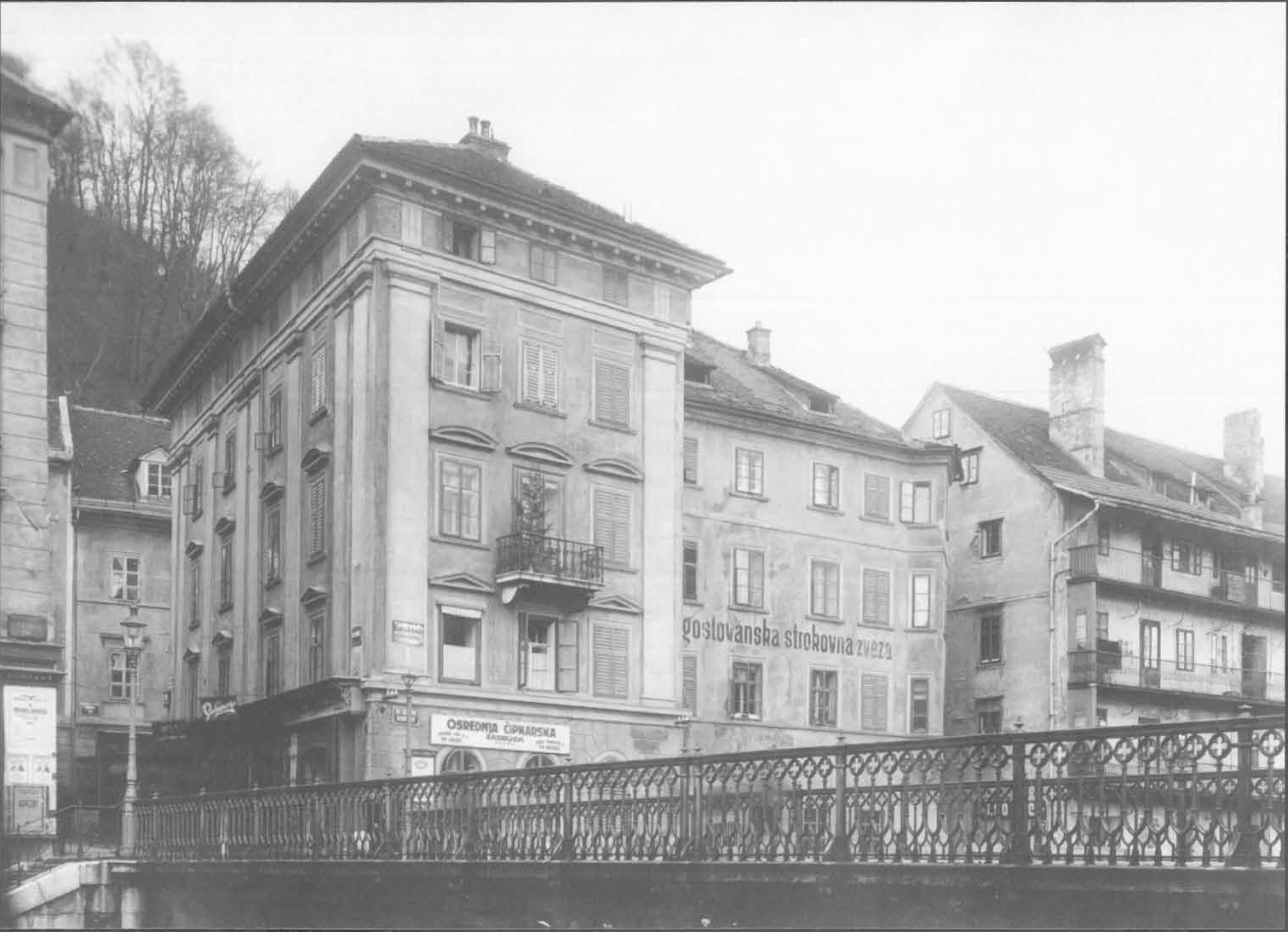
The bridge at its original location in the center of Ljubljana, at the site of today's Cobblers' Bridge

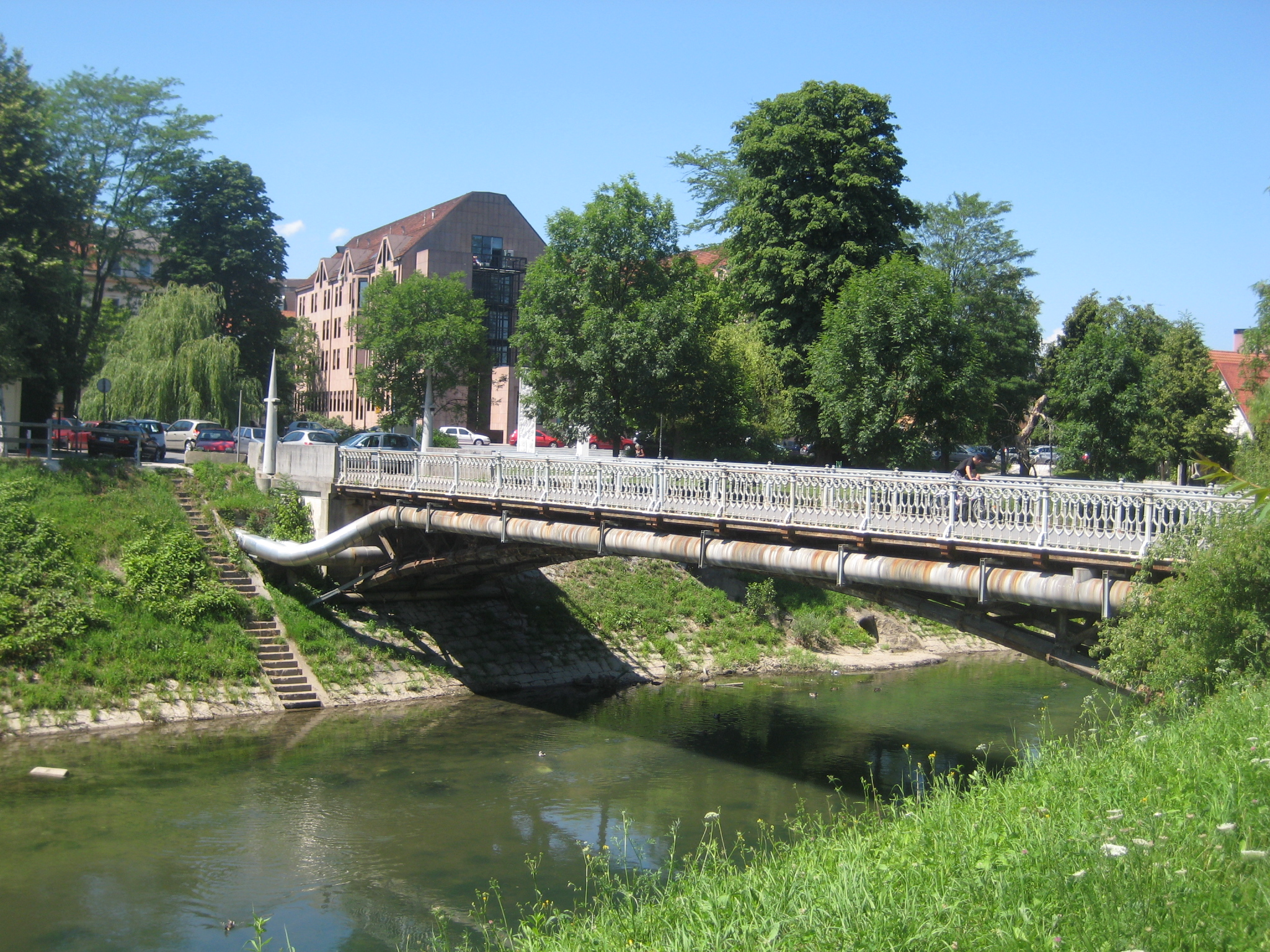
The bridge at its second location near the Ljubljana University Medical Centre. A district heating pipeline marks its appearance.
