= Old Bridge (Maribor) =

Old Bridge Slovene: Stari most German: Alte Brücke
- The Old Bridge in august 2025
- Coordinates: 46°33′20″N 15°38′45″E
- Crosses: Drava
- Locale: Maribor, Slovenia
- Other name(s): State Bridge, Main Bridge, Drava Bridge

History
- Architect: Eugen Fassbender
- Opened: 23 August 1913; 113 years ago

Location
- Interactive map of Old Bridge

The Old Bridge (German: Alte Brücke, Slovene: Stari most), also named the State Bridge (German: Staatsbrücke, Slovene: Državni most), the Main Bridge (Glavni most), and the Drava Bridge (Dravski most), is a bridge crossing the Drava River in Maribor, northeastern Slovenia. It links Main Square (Glavni trg) and Pobrežje Street (Pobreška cesta) and is 270 metres (890 ft) long. Its central part, spanning the Drava, is 166 m (545 ft) long and has three steel arches.

The bridge was completed in 1913 and opened to traffic on 23 August of that year. During World War II, it was damaged and later partially rebuilt. The last renovations took place in 1990 and 1998.

== Gallery ==
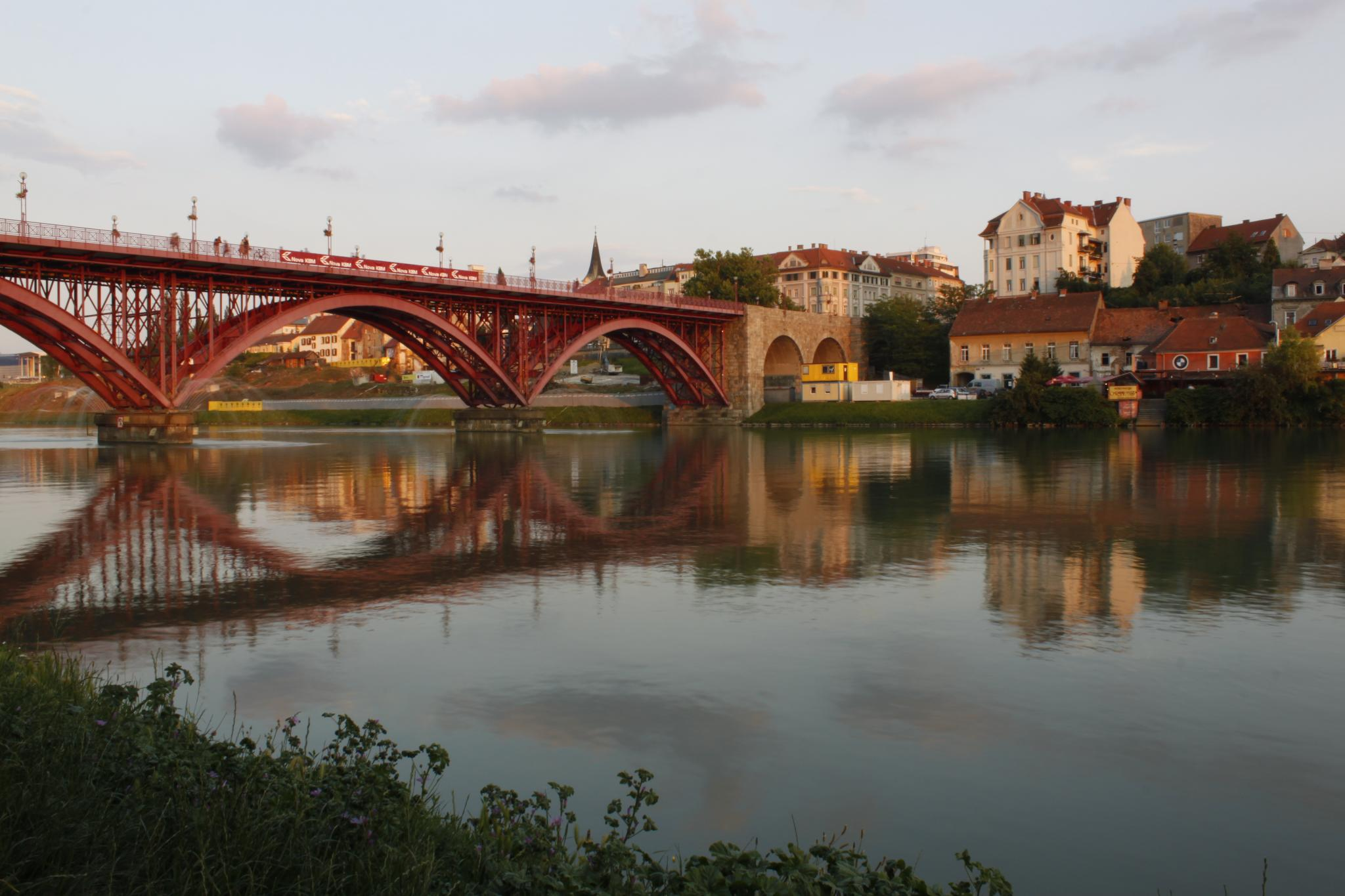
The Old Bridge in 2011

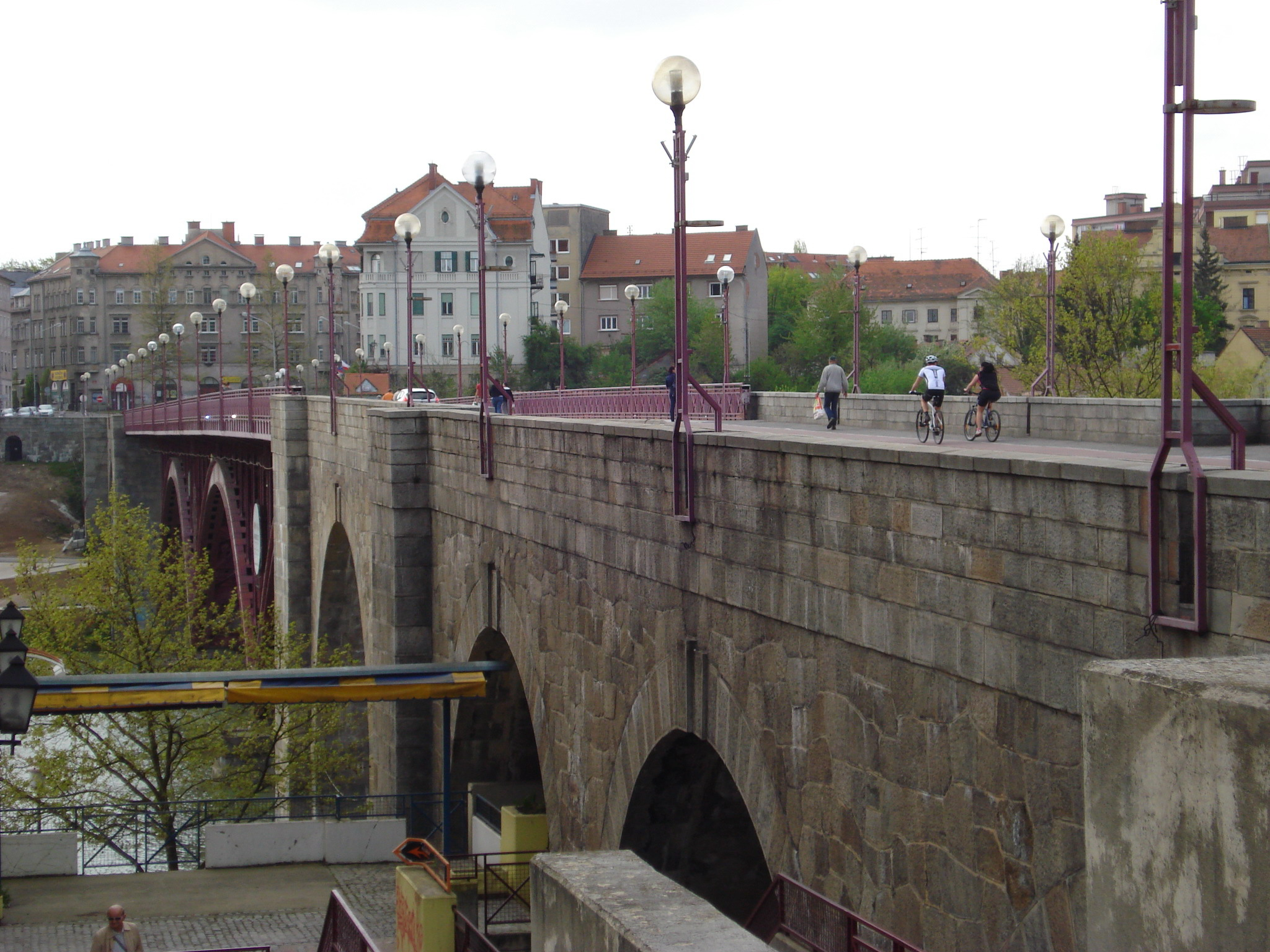
The Old Bridge in 2013

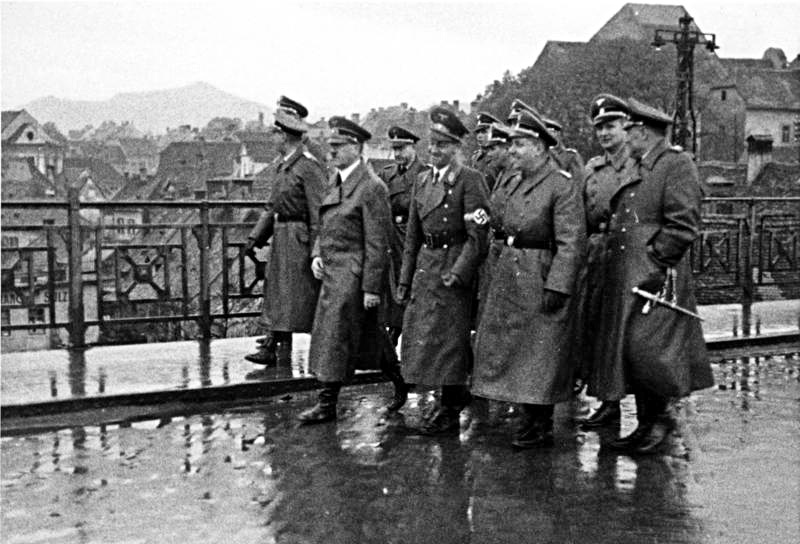
Adolf Hitler on the Old Bridge, April 1941
