= St. Peter's Bridge =

Bridge in Ljubljana, Slovenia

Coordinates: 46°3′1.74″N 14°30′59.23″E

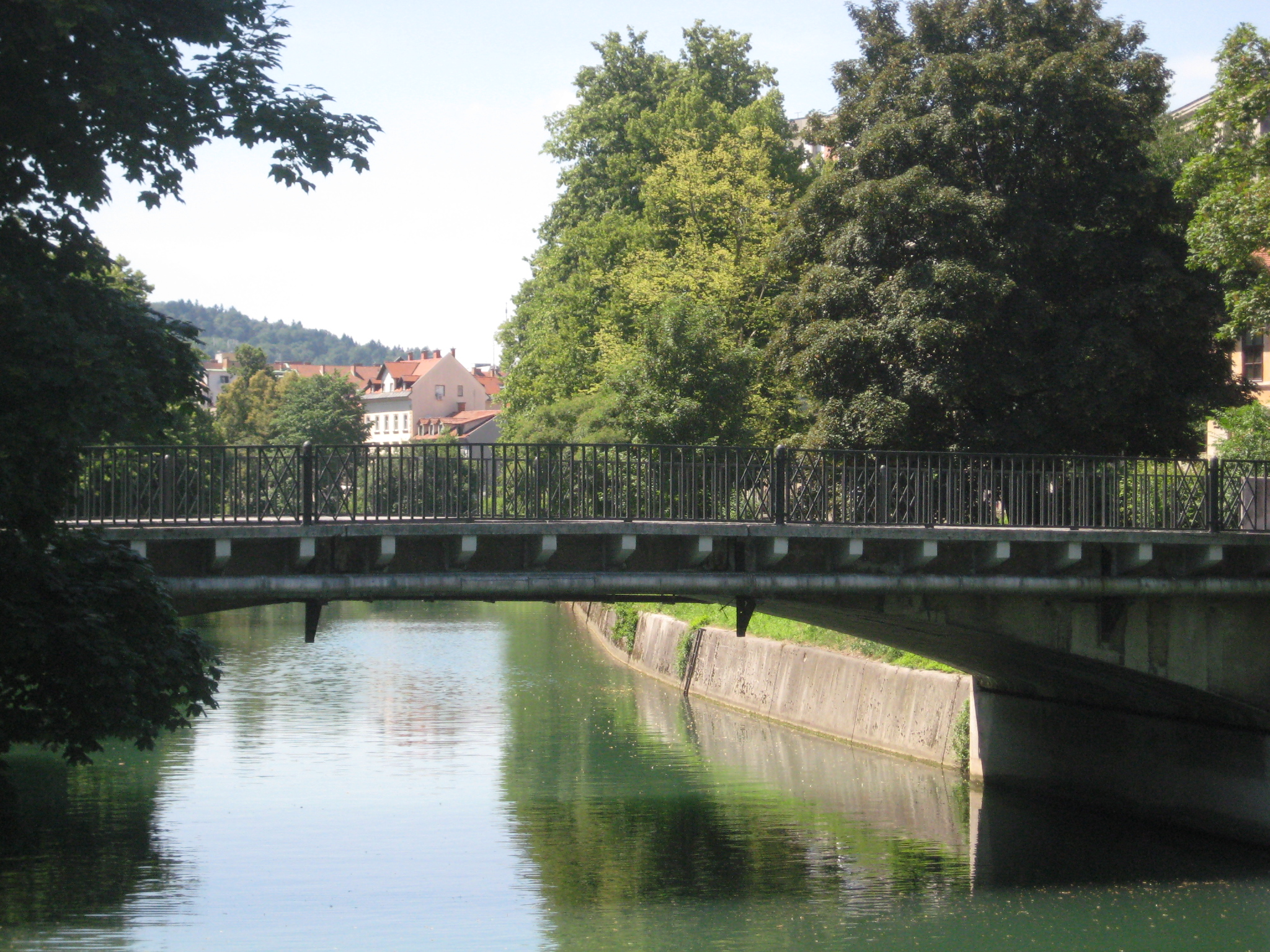
St. Peter's Bridge links the residential districts of Šempeter and Poljane.

St. Peter's Bridge (Slovene: Šempetrski most or Šentpetrski most, in older sources also Šent Peterski most or Šentpeterski most), also Ambrož Bridge (Ambrožev most), is a bridge in Ljubljana, the capital of Slovenia, that crosses the river Ljubljanica in the northeastern end of the old town. It is a continuation of Rozman Street (Rozmanova ulica). West of it lie Vraz Square (Vrazov trg) on the northern (left) bank of the river and Ambrož Square (Ambrožev trg) on its southern (right) bank. East of it lies the Petkovšek Embankment (Petkovškovo nabrežje) on the northern bank and the Poljane Embankment (Poljansko nabrežje) on the southern bank. The bridge is named after the nearby St. Peter's Church. It is intended primarily for motorised traffic, but is also used by pedestrians.

== History ==
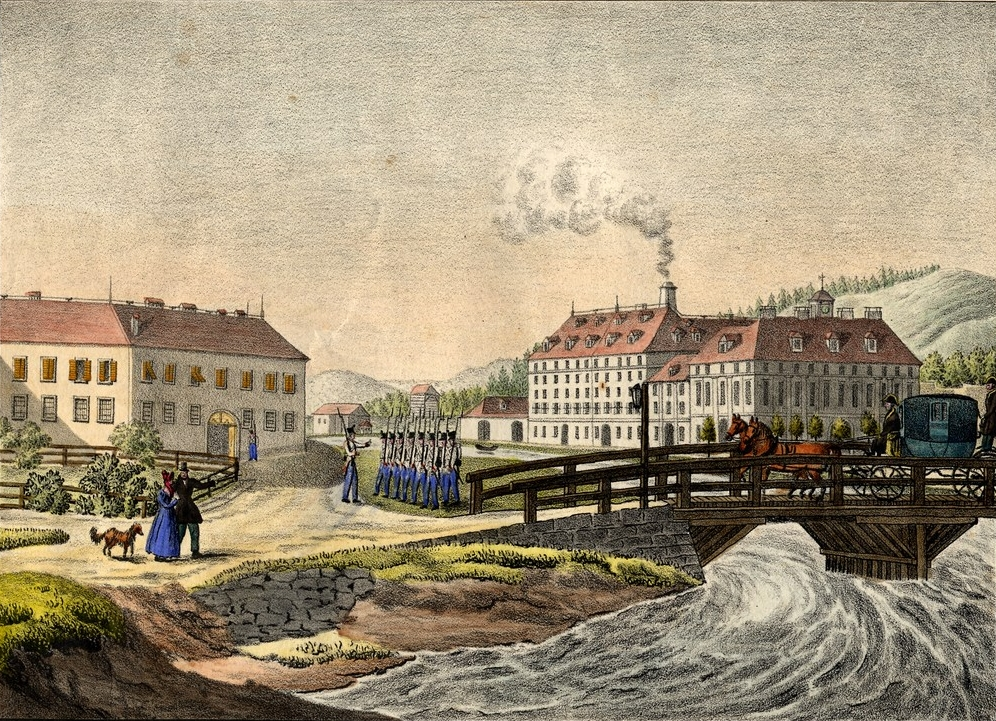
St. Peter's Bridge in the mid-19th century

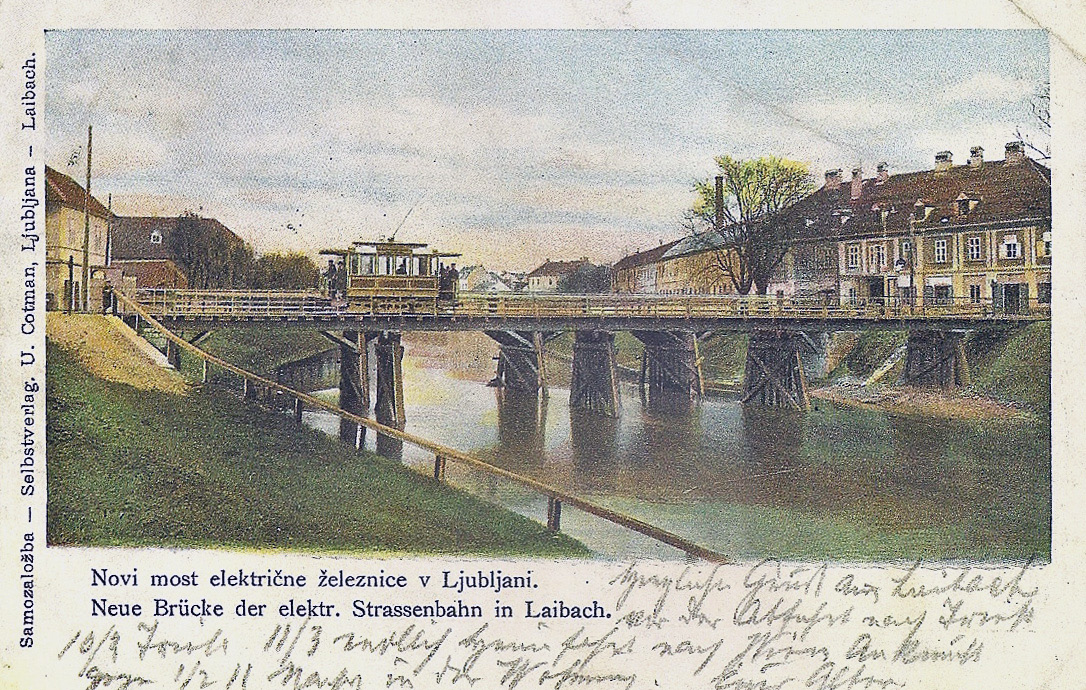
An early-20th century postcard of St. Peter's Bridge with the Ljubljana tram

Originally, a wooden footbridge held over the Ljubljanica on the site. It was property of Bishops of Ljubljana, who used it to access their land on the other bank. According to a legend, unconfirmed by historical sources, Bishop Thomas Chrön (1560–1630) led a procession of the Blessed Sacrament across the footbridge, guarded from the Lutherans by the blacksmiths of Ljubljana. The story tells that the Chrön Cross at nearby Grain Square (Žitni trg), now Ambrož Square, was erected in remembrance of their victory.

In 1776, the wooden Bridge Behind the Barracks (Zakasarniški most) replaced the footbridge. It was built to link St. Peter's Barracks north of the river and the Poljane residential district south of it. In 1835, it was replaced by a new one. There were actually two bridges, the wider one used by draft animals and the narrower one by pedestrians, and from the beginning of the 20th century, by the Ljubljana tram.

The construction of the present iron and concrete bridge started at the beginning of the 20th century. Due to World War I, it was only completed in 1918. The wooden bridge was transferred to the Prule neighbourhood, where it then served as the Prule Bridge.
