= Miroslav Nenadović =

Yugoslav mechanical engineer (1904–1989)

- Born: 18 March 1904; Belgrade, Kingdom of Serbia
- Died: 21 February 1989 (aged 84); Belgrade, SFR Yugoslavia
- Education: University of Belgrade and Saint Cyr Paris
- Years active: 1927–1988

Miroslav Nenadović (Serbian Cyrillic: Мирослав Ненадовић; 18 March 1904 – 21 February 1989) was an engineer and professor at the Faculty of Mechanical Engineering in Belgrade, a Yugoslav aerospace engineer, who gave immense contribution to the development of the faculty of Mechanical Engineering in Belgrade and the Yugoslav Air Force in general. In 1958 he was elected an associate fellow of the Serbian Academy of Sciences and Arts (SASA), while in 1965 he was elected full member of the Academy.

== Life ==
He was born on 18 March 1904 in Belgrade (Serbia), where he completed both elementary school and high school. He studied Mathematical Sciences at the University of Belgrade, graduating in 1926. Upon his graduation, he continued his studies in mathematics at the Department for Mechanical and Electrical Engineering at the Faculty of Technical Engineering in Belgrade, graduating in 1932.

== Career ==
After graduating from the Faculty of Engineering, the French government granted him a scholarship in 1933, so that year he pursued his studies at the Aerotechnical Department of the École spéciale militaire de Saint-Cyr Paris. In 1936 he passed the state PhD exam in aerospace sciences, while in 1937, he was promoted to the title of PhD in Sorbonne. As of 1935, he was a regular associate to the l'Institut Aérotechnique de Saint-Cyr-l'École (Aerotehnical Institute in Saint Cyr) as an assistant professor, an associate of the Breguet aircraft factory and later he was engaged as an associate for Caudron-Renault, while also being engaged as associate for the Air Force Secretariat. In 1937 he was elected associate professor in the newly formed Aeronautics Group at the Mechanical Engineering Department at the Faculty of Engineering, University of Belgrade, only to be elected a full-tenured professor in 1951. During his lifetime he held various positions from Head of the Department to Dean of Faculty.

On January 30, 1958 he was elected an associate fellow of the Serbian Academy of Sciences and Arts (SANU) – The Department of Engineering, and on 16 December 1965, he became a full member of the SANU. In 1971 he was appointed deputy secretary of the Department of Technical Sciences, while from 1977 to 31 December 1988 he served as Secretary of the Department. During his work at the Academy of Sciences, he participated actively in the work of the Committee for Aeronautics, the Environment Protection Committee, the Energy Committee and the Astronautics Committee. Much of his work, M. Nenadovic dedicated to scientific research and theoretical and experimental study of the aerodynamic design of aircraft, including construction of aircraft while also taking interest in equipment for aerodynamic testing and the influence of wind on the building structures.

== Research projects ==
After World War I, industrialization began in Yugoslavia, which had previously been a predominantly agricultural country with somewhat developed light industries. As early as 1923, the first aircraft factory "Ikarus" was founde in Novi Sad in 1924. Rogozarski was established in Belgrade and in 1927 a Zemun-based company Zmaj " and Brege in Kraljevo took shape. The first aircraft engine factory called “Vlajkovic and Comp” was founded in Belgrade, while as early as 1929 an aircraft engine factory began operating in Rakovica near Belgrade. A factory for optics and precise mechanics "Teleoptik" from Zemun which was founded in 1923, changed its product range and in 1928 went on to be mainly engaged in manufacturing aeronautical instruments and equipment. This was followed by the founding of new factories for precise mechanics "Mikron" in 1930 and "Nestor" in 1938.

The initial production in these factories focused on aircraft and equipment by foreign licenses, thus helping bridge the technological gap between the developed countries and Yugoslav. At that time, the Yugoslav industry was not producing a single steam turbine, water turbine, tractor, agricultural machine, not even a bicycle, yet it was making an aircraft which at the time was one of the most complex mechanical systems as well as locomotives. For the first aircraft Hansa-Brandenburg B.I and Hansa-Brandenburg C.I, the Ministry of the Army and Navy (MViM) placed at the disposal the technical documentation for these aircraft, created by engineer Rudolf Fizir, (Hansa-Brandenburg B.I to Ikarus, Hansa-Brandenburg C.I to Rogozarski factory) to aircraft factories which at the beginning of their work was invaluable. As for the staff, the first aerospace engineers were educated abroad, and in 1937 the Aeronautics Group at the Faculty of Technical Sciences, University in Belgrade was established. The third part of the problem was the organization of research in this area because it was necessary to enable the local aircraft industry to carry out aerodynamic tests of its own home-made aircraft in their home country, as it was an established practice for aircraft models to be tested in aerospace institutes abroad. After Professor Nenadovic returned from his studies in France, he undertook the painstaking work of creating the material basis for aerodynamic testing. The idea for project of Aerotechnical Institute near Belgrade was drafted, and in 1939/40 projects had already been finished. However, with the invasion of Yugoslavia in 1941, all such research. The organization of scientific research in this field in our country came to a halt. The conditions for the continuation of these activities came to be fulfilled after the liberation of the country when prof. Nenadovic and his associates formed the Aerotechnical institute within the Faculty of Mechanical Engineering. The equipment designed by prof. Nenadovic and his associates is divided into two groups: wind tunnels and other aerospace equipment.

== Aircraft projects ==
- Aircraft BN-101 – sports biplane designed in 1939 in Saint-Cyr, France, M.A. Starck constructed the plane, the prototype was made in France in 1941/42., fitted with a 76 hp Renier engine, with cruising speed 225 km / h, landing speed 55 km / h, with just a 56m-long runway.
- Aircraft BN-203 – three-seater, biplane with 156 hp GM engine and propeller propulsion, with a tricycle-type landing gear. The project was done on behalf of the aircraft factory "Vistad" in 1940and the purpose of it was to be used as air-taxi.
- Rogožarski Brucoš – a sports training aircraft for basic training designed in collaboration with M. Mitrovic-Spirta in 1940 for the aircraft factory "Rogžarski" as a project for the public competition opened by the Air Force command (the prototype flew in 1940.). It had a designation NM, the initials of designers Nenadovic-Mitrovic, and the propulsion unit being engine being a 135 hp Gipsy. This aircraft was a low-wing monoplane of wooden structure .
- NEMI – a twin-engine fighter monoplane with engines Gnome-Rohn, tricycle-type landing gear. Aerodynamic tests were carried out in Aerospace Institutes Eiffel in Saint-Cyr and Warsaw. The plane was designed in collaboration with M. Mitrovic and using the initials of designers Nenadovic and Mitrovic the plane was called NEMI. The plane is designed for the purposes of the air force command 1940/41, but further development came to a halt with the outbreak of the Second World War.

== Gallery ==
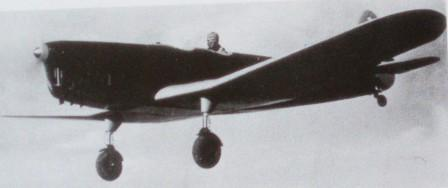
Rogožarski Brucoš Yugoslav aircraft trainer.

Subsonic and transonic wind tunnel

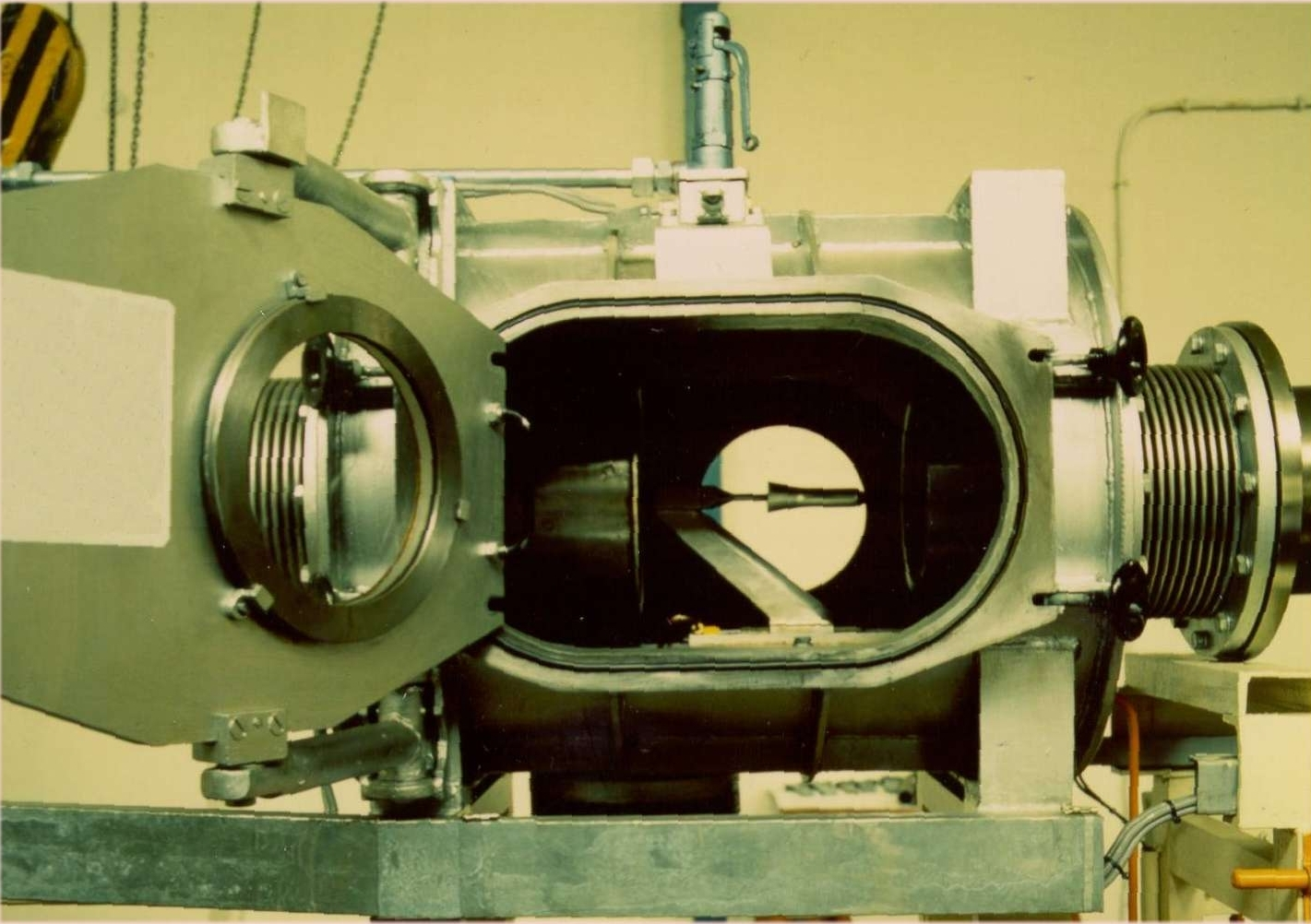
Hypersonic wind tunnel

== Wind tunnel projects ==
- AT-SB-E – the project of a wind tunnel with operating unit being 2.00x1.80 m2, coaxial contra fans and power 2x48 = 96 kW (performed in a small tunnel in 1941)
- AT-SB-P – propulsion wind tunnel with contra power fans of 5 kW, elliptical cross section of 0.60x40m2 in 1948.
- AT-SP-1 – wind tunnel for qualitative studies of flow in supersonic speed, storage capacity cca 24 m3 and an installed capacity compressor 2 x 20 = 40 kW in 1949.
- AT-SB-1 – wind tunnel project for aerodynamic testing, operating unit 2.80 x 00 m2, with an installed power of 180 kW = 2h95 and coaxial contra fans, 1952 / 57.
- AA-SD-1 – wind tunnel project, vacuum type, with an intermittent effect for aerodynamic testing in supersonic speed. Operating unit 300 x 225 mm2, engine power of vacuum pumps 6 x 35 = 210 kW, tank capacity cca 320 m3.
- AT-SB-1 – propulsion unit of engine installed capacity 2 x 300 = 600 kW, 1956/58
- AT-SD-2 – wind tunnel with continuous action, with installed power of vacuum pumps’ engine 6 x 35 = 210 kW, 1956.
- AT-SD-3 – Vacuum-type wind tunnel project with intermittent action for aerodynamic testing in supersonic speed. Installed power of vacuum pumps 6x35 +190 = 400 kW,

== Other aerospace equipment ==
- Reumaskop,
- Reoelektroskop,
- Reohidroskop,
- Aerospace scales

== Teaching career ==
Immediately after he defended his PhD thesis in 1937, Miroslav Nenadovic, PhD, got involved in teaching courses at the Faculty of Engineering, University of Belgrade, as an associate professor in the newly founded Aeronautical group, at the Department of Mechanical engineering. As of 1937 he took up the positions at the Faculty of Mechanical Engineering as Head of the Aerospace Technology Department, Chair of the Aerospace Group and the Aerospace Technology Department Aviation Department, Chair of Aeromechanics, director of the Institute of Mechanical Engineering and director of the Aeromechanical Institute. From 1938 to the beginning of WWII, in addition to the regular duties at the Faculty of Engineering, he was a regular associate to airplane factories: "Utva", "Rogozarski", "Ikarus" and "Vistad".

Following the end of the war in 1945, he founded the Institute of Mechanical Engineering, at the Faculty of Technical Engineering, jointly with several laboratories that contributed to the renewal of faculty labs destroyed during the Second World War. After the reorganization of the University and Technical College, and following the establishment of the Faculty of Mechanical Engineering, the Institute of Mechanical Engineering was transformed into a research facility, later turned into the Bureau for Machines and Tools, at the Faculty of Mechanical Engineering, as well as other workshops for maintenance.

Along with the restoration of the Faculty Mechanical Engineering following liberation, Professor Nenadovic continued his activities in the field of scientific research programs, including the development of the Yugoslav Air Force in collaboration with such institutions as the Directorate of the Aviation Industry, VTI, the Mostar-based plane and helicopter factory "Soko", Air Force Technical Institute in Zarkovo and other companies engaged in the production or manufacture of aircraft or production for aviation’s needs.

Together with his associates, professor Nenandovic founded Institute of Aerospace Technology at the Faculty of Mechanical Engineering. As the founder of the Institute, he established a number of laboratories, the equipment for the laboratories was designed and developed by the members of the Institute Professor under the mentorship of professor Nenadovic. Thanks to this equipment, various experiments are conducted at the Institute and lectures in various fields of aerospace technology and related disciplines. In this way professor Nenadovic together with his colleagues laid a solid foundation for modern teaching thus educating young experts the Yugoslav aviation needed so much.

In 1951 he was elected full-tenured professor, in the Aerospace Engineering Department, of the Faculty of Mechanical Engineering, while in the period from 1956 to 1959 he was Dean of the Faculty of Mechanical Engineering. As dean of the Faculty of Mechanical Engineering he gave enormous contribution to completing the experimental part of teaching, establishing and equipping laboratories the newly built Faculty building needed. During his tenure, a new building of the Faculty of Mechanical Engineering was completed with facilities and labs for wind tunnels with complete infrastructure. Professor Nenadovic loved his students and they loved him, and out of favor they called him "Uncle Misha", to which he always replied by calling them "my children,". Another interesting bit of information was that everyone in SANU, both his fellow academicians and staff called him by his nickname "Miro".

== Books ==
Prof. M. Nenadovic was a prolific author and he published many scientific papers in national and international journals, while also authoring papers that were never published, but were part of internal communications of the Aerotechnical institutes including military and government institutions. Furthermore, he wrote several books most of which are used as university textbooks, some of them had several editions and are used to this day.

1. Ненадовић, Мирослав. (1948). Основи аеродинамичких конструкција - Аеропрофили (Први део) (in Serbian). Београд: Научна књига. p. 364.
2. Ненадовић, Мирослав. (1948). Основи аеродинамичких конструкција - Аеропрофили (Други део) (in Serbian). Београд: Научна књига. p. 608.
3. Ненадовић, Мирослав. (1949). Основи аеродинамичких конструкција - Елисе (in Serbian). Београд: Научна књига. p. 450.
4. Ненадовић, Мирослав. (1950). Основи аеродинамичких конструкција -(Први део) (in Serbian). Београд: Научна књига. p. 663.
5. Ненадовић, Мирослав. (1950). Основи аеродинамичких конструкција - (Прилог) (in Serbian). Београд: Научна књига. p. 32.
6. Ненадовић, Мирослав. (1967). Основи аеродинамичких конструкција - Пловни трапови (in Serbian). Београд: Научна књига. p. 210.
7. Ненадовић, Мирослав. (1971). Стабилност и управљивост летилица (Књига I, II, III и прилог) (in Serbian). Београд: Машински факултет. pp. 237, 210, 274 и 81.
8. Ненадовић, Мирослав. (1972). Уздужна динамичка стабилност и управљивост авиона (in Serbian). Београд: Машински факултет. p. 680.
9. Ненадовић, Мирослав. (1979). Основи космичког лета (in Serbian). Београд: Институт техничких наука САНУ и Универзитет у Београду. p. 742.

He worked extensively on the development of encyclopedias, as an for aerospace technology within the Technical Encyclopedia of the Yugoslav Institute of Lexigraphy, was a member of the Editorial Board of the Bulletin of the SASA, editor of Mechanical Engineering Gazette and a member of the Standing Subcommittee for Scientific Information, Publications and Documents of the Republic Research Association.

== Awards and honors ==
For his dedication academic Miroslav Nenadović received the following awards:

- October Award of the City of Belgrade in 1974. year
- Order of the Red Flag 1965, and
- Numerous plaques and acknowledgments.

He was also a member of many national and international professional organizations such as:

- Српске академије наука и уметности (САНУ), (Serbian Academy of Sciences and Arts – SASA),
- Југословенског аерокосмонаутичког друштва (1972), (Yugoslav Society of Aeronautics and Astronautics),
- Југословенског друштва за механику, (Yugoslav Society of Mechanics),
- Друштва математичара, физичара и астронома Србије, (Serbian Society of Mathematicians, Physicists and Astronomers)
- International Academy of Astronautics (1972),
- The Royal Aeronautical Society (1951),
- Congres International Aeronautique – C.I.A (1953),
- Association Aeronautique et Astronautique de France,
- American Institute of Aeronautics and Astronautics (1975.),
- International Council of the Aeronautical Sciences – ICAS,
- Council of Engineering Institutions (1965.).
- GAMM (Gesellschaft für Angewandte Mathematik und Mechanik)

== See also ==
- Serbian Academy of Sciences and Arts
- Rogožarski Brucoš
- Wind tunnel

== Sources ==
1. Јанић, Чедомир; Петровић, Огњан (2010). Век авијације у Србији 1910–2010, 225 значајних летелица (in Serbian). Београд: Аерокомуникације. ISBN 978-86-913973-0-2.
2. Петровић, Златко (January 1998). "60 година ваздухопловства у универзитетској настави". Аеромагазин (in Serbian). 1. YU-Београд: ББ-Софт: 44–46.
3. Жутић, Никола; Бошковић Лазар. (1999). Икарус - Икарбус: 1923–1998 (in Serbian). YU-Београд: Икарбус.
4. Општа, Енциклопедија (1978). "Ненадовић, Мирослав (1904- )". Мала енциклопедија Просвета (in Serbian). YU-Београд: Просвета.
5. Обрадовић, Никола (1973). У спомен сто година науке о машинама - осврт на раздобље 1873–1941 (in Serbian). YU-Београд: Машински факултет.
6. Весовић, М; Д. Поповић (1973). Машински факултет у Београду о равитку наставе и науке - у раздобљу 1945–1973 (in Serbian). YU-Београд: Машински факултет.
7. САНУ (1964). "Мирослав Ненадовић - дописни члан (Биографија)". Годишњак LXXI за 1964 (in Serbian). YU-Београд: Српска Академија Наука и Уметности. pp. 299–304.
8. Ненадовић, Мирослав (1967). Експериментална истраживања у развоју концепције летилица (in Serbian). YU-Београд: САНУ (Посебна издања)- Споменица књига 30. pp. 167–189.
9. САНУ (1971). Годишњак LXXV за 1968 (in Serbian). YU-Београд: Српска Академија Наука и Уметности. p. 601.
10. САНУ (1972). Годишњак LXXVI за 1969 (in Serbian). YU-Београд: Српска Академија Наука и Уметности. p. 635.
11. САНУ (1975). Годишњак LXXIX за 1972 (in Serbian). YU-Београд: Српска Академија Наука и Уметности. pp. 731–732.
12. САНУ (1979). Годишњак LXXXV за 1978 (in Serbian). YU-Београд: Српска Академија Наука и Уметности. pp. 205–208.
13. Вукобратовић, Миомир (1990). "Мирослав Ненадовић (1904–1989)". Годишњак XCVI за 1989 (in Serbian). YU-Београд: Српска Академија Наука и Уметности. pp. 543–545.
