= Philip Mansion =

Building in Slovenia

Coordinates: 46°3′3.08″N 14°30′22.49″E

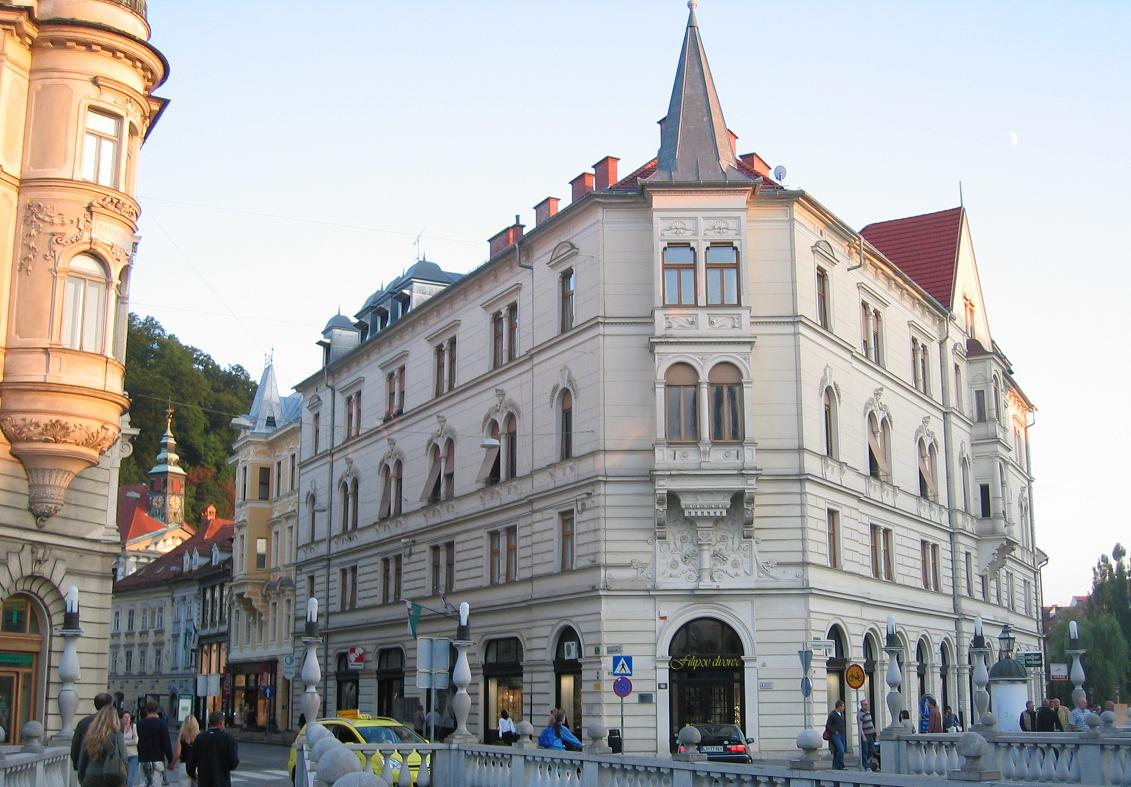
Philip Mansion seen from the Triple Bridge. On the left, a small portion of the Kresija Building can be seen.

Philip Mansion (Slovene: Filipov dvorec) is a building in central Ljubljana, the capital of Slovenia. It is located along the river Ljubljanica, at the corner of the Cankar Embankment (Cankarjevo nabrežje) and Stritar Street (Stritar Street), next to the Triple Bridge. On the other side of Stritar Street stands the Kresija Building. The two buildings mark the entry into the town's medieval part under Ljubljana Castle.

The two buildings were designed after the 1895 Ljubljana earthquake by the Graz architect Leopold Theyer and completed in 1898. The mansion was built by the tradesman Filip Schreyer. Philip Mansion is distinguished by a Renaissance Revival style. It is said that small spires on its façades were built at the explicit demand of the Mayor Ivan Hribar, who was an admirer of Czech culture and wanted Ljubljana to resemble Prague, the "city of a hundred spires". However, the more probable explanation is that the spires were meant to serve as a reminder of the town gates in the old defensive wall that stood in their place.
