= Ivan Hribar =

Slovene politician (1851–1941)

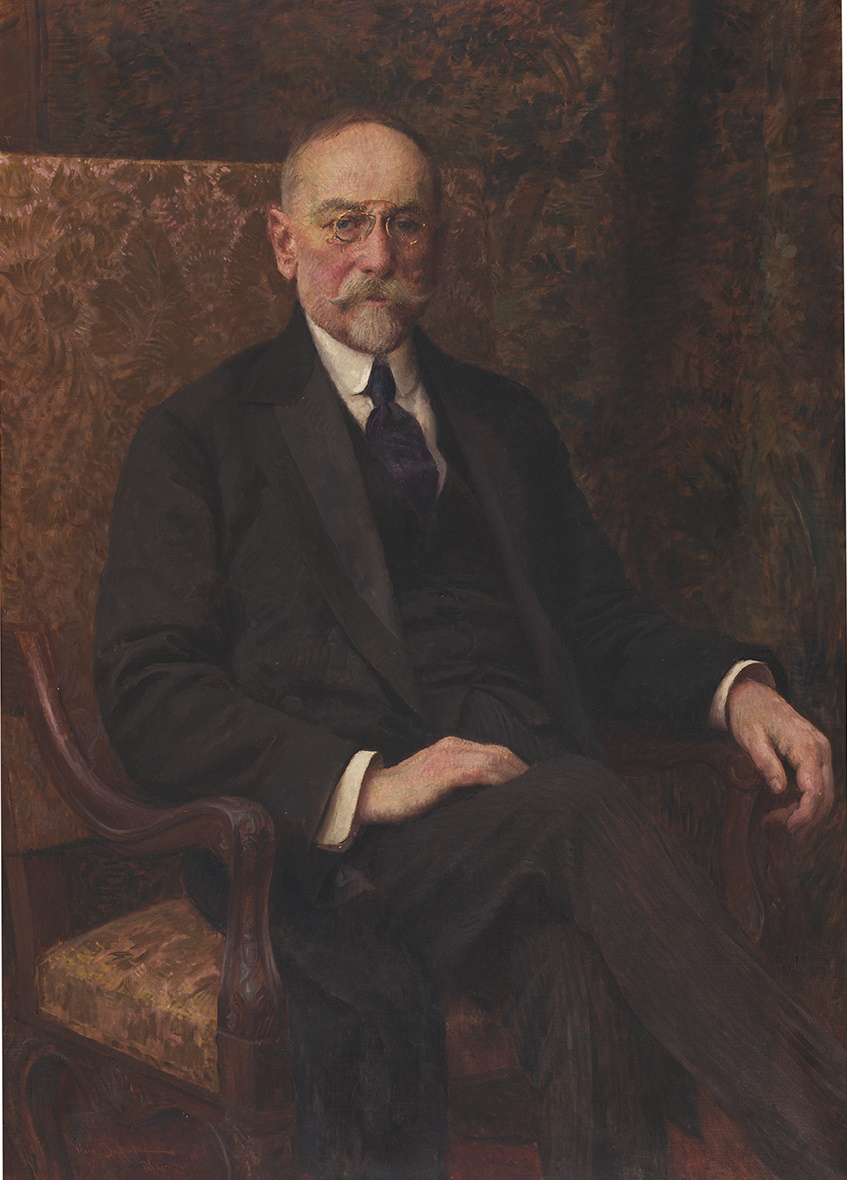
- Hribar painted by Vlaho Bukovac, 1921
- Born: 19 September 1851; Trzin, Duchy of Carniola
- Died: 18 April 1941 (aged 89); Ljubljana, Province of Ljubljana
- Cause of death: Protest by suicide
- Education: University of Vienna

Ivan Hribar (19 September 1851 – 18 April 1941) was a Slovene and Yugoslav banker, politician, diplomat and journalist. During the start of the 20th century, he was one of the leaders of the National Progressive Party, and one of the most important figures of Slovene liberal nationalism. Between 1896 and 1910, he was the mayor of Ljubljana (nowadays the capital of Slovenia), and greatly contributed to its rebuilding and modernisation after the 1895 earthquake.

== In Austria-Hungary ==
Ivan Hribar was born in the Carniolan town of Trzin in what was then the Austrian Empire (now in Slovenia) and baptized Johann Hribar. He studied law at the University of Vienna and made a professional career as the representative of a Czech bank in Ljubljana between 1876 and 1919.

In the 1880s he became involved in politics, soon emerging as one of the leading figures of the Slovene national liberalism in Austria-Hungary. Together with his close political ally Ivan Tavčar he founded the National Party of Carniola, later renamed to National Progressive Party. From 1882 he served as city councillor of Laibach. In 1896 he was elected mayor of Ljubljana and became famous for implementing a large scale reconstruction of the town after the Ljubljana earthquake of 1895. He invited the architect Max Fabiani to make a new urban development plan for the town. This included the complete renovation of Prešeren Square and the area around the Triple Bridge (the Kresija Palace and the Philip Mansion), as well as the construction of the Dragon Bridge: all of these buildings are nowadays considered as central symbols of Ljubljana. Hribar's aim was to transform Ljubljana into a prestigious centre of all Slovene Lands and thus create a cultural and economic capital for the Slovenian people. He carried out a radical modernization of the city's infrastructure, including electrification and the introduction of trams. He also cleaned up the city's public finances. During his time in office Hribar often clashed with the ethnic German minority of Ljubljana on a number of issues.

He remained in office until 1910, when the Emperor Franz Joseph I refused to confirm his reelection, because of his alleged role in anti-German riots two years earlier, in which two Slovenian students were shot by the Austro-Hungarian Army. He was succeeded by Ivan Tavčar.

Between 1889 and 1908, he served as member of the Carniolan Provincial Diet, and between 1907 and 1911 as member of the Austrian Parliament.

During his political activity in Austria-Hungary, Hribar was a great supporter of collaboration between Slovenes and other Slavic peoples, especially Czechs. He made many efforts to bring Czech investments to the Slovene Lands and he helped to establish several institutions on the Czech model, most famously the Sokol athletic association. He is also said to have based the reconstruction of Ljubljana so that the town would resemble Prague. Due to his Panslavic ideas, he was imprisoned twice during World War I, between August and December 1914 and between January and March 1915. Between April 1915 and June 1917, he was placed in house arrest in an estate in Land Salzburg, far from his homeland, in order to isolate him from his potential political allies.

Together with Mihajlo Rostohar, Hribar also played an important role in the establishment of the University of Ljubljana.

== In the Kingdom of Yugoslavia ==
After the end of World War I and the establishment of the Kingdom of Yugoslavia, he withdrew from party politics, although he remained active in public life. Between 1919 and 1921, he served as the Yugoslav Minister Plenipotentiary to Czechoslovakia. In 1921 he was appointed provisional representative of the Yugoslav central government in Slovenia, a post he held until the implementation of the new subdivisions in 1923. As a staunch advocate of Yugoslav nation building, he supported the centralist dictatorship of King Alexander. In 1932 he was appointed senator by the king and remained one until 1938 when he retired. In the late 1930s he voiced his support for a common political platform of all patriotic anti-fascist forces. In 1940, after Hitler's Invasion of France, he became one of the founders of the "Association of Friends of the Soviet Union," which served as one of the rallying grounds for the later development of the Liberation Front of the Slovenian People.

== After the Italian annexation of Ljubljana ==
Hribar was known as a passionate politician and a great Slovene and Yugoslav patriot. After the Axis invasion of Yugoslavia in 1941, Hribar committed suicide (at the age of eighty-nine) as a protest against the Italian annexation of Ljubljana. On 18 April, after returning home from a meeting with the Fascist Italian authorities, which had just offered him the mayorship of the city, he jumped into the Ljubljanica River, wrapped in the Yugoslav flag. He left a note with verses from France Prešeren's poem The Baptism on the Savica:

Manj strašna noč je v črne zemlje krili,
kot so pod svetlim soncem sužnji dnovi.

Less fearful the long night of life’s denial
Than living ‘neath the sun in subjugation!

== Tributes ==
After World War II, the embankment of Ljubljanica from which Ivan Hribar jumped into the river was named after him. On 30 August 2010, a monument to Hribar was unveiled on the Hribar Embankment (Slovene: Hribarjevo nabrežje), next to the Shoemakers' Bridge (Čevljarski most), not far from the place of his death. The monument was created by the Bosnian Slovenian sculptor Mirsad Begić.

== See also ==
- Liberalism in Slovenia
- Anton Aškerc

== Sources ==
- Zvonko Bergant, Slovenski klasični liberalizem (Ljubljana: Nova revija, 2000).
- Igor Grdina, Slovenci med tradicijo in perspektivo: politični mozaik 1860-1918 (Ljubljana: Študentska založba, 2003).
- Janez Kajzer, S tramovi posprto mesto (Ljubljana: Mihelač, 1995).
- Vasilij Melik, "Ivan Hribar in njegovi Spomini", in Ivan Hribar, Moji spomini (ed. Vasilij Melik) (Ljubljana: Slovenska matica, 1983–84).
- Breda Mihelač, Urbanistični razvoj Ljubljane (Ljubljana: Partizanska knjiga, 1983).
- Jurij Perovšek, Liberalizem in vprašanje slovenstva: nacionalna politika liberalnega tabora v letih 1918-1929 (Ljubljana: Modrijan, 1996).

Preceded by Peter Grasselli	Mayor of Ljubljana; 1896-1910	Succeeded by Ivan Tavčar
