= 1750 Rijeka earthquake =

- UTC time: around 9 PM (UTC+1)
- Local date: November 28, 1750
- Magnitude: Unknown
- Depth: Unknown
- Epicenter: 45°19′12″N 14°26′24″E

The 1750 Rijeka earthquake (Croatian: Riječki potres 1750., Potres u Rijeci 1750.) was a devastating earthquake that struck the city of Rijeka and its wider surroundings on November 28, 1750, at around 9 PM (UTC+1), with a series of periodic aftershocks until December 17. The earthquake completely changed the face of the city, which, through comprehensive reconstruction, grew into the maritime and port center of the Croatian Littoral, as well as the Croatian part of the Northern Adriatic. The earthquake damaged the City Tower, the old city hall, and Trsat Castle, as well as the Churches of the Assumption of the Blessed Virgin Mary in Rijeka, St. Roch, St. Three Kings, St. George on Trsat, St. Jerome, Jesuit building and Benedictine monastery, as well as houses of the noble families Peri, Minoli, Zanchi and others.

Empress Maria Theresa approved funds for the renovation of the Old Town and the construction of the New Town of Rijeka on 3 November 1753.
