= Kresija Building =

Palace in Ljubljana, Slovenia

Coordinates: 46°3′3.64″N 14°30′24.52″E

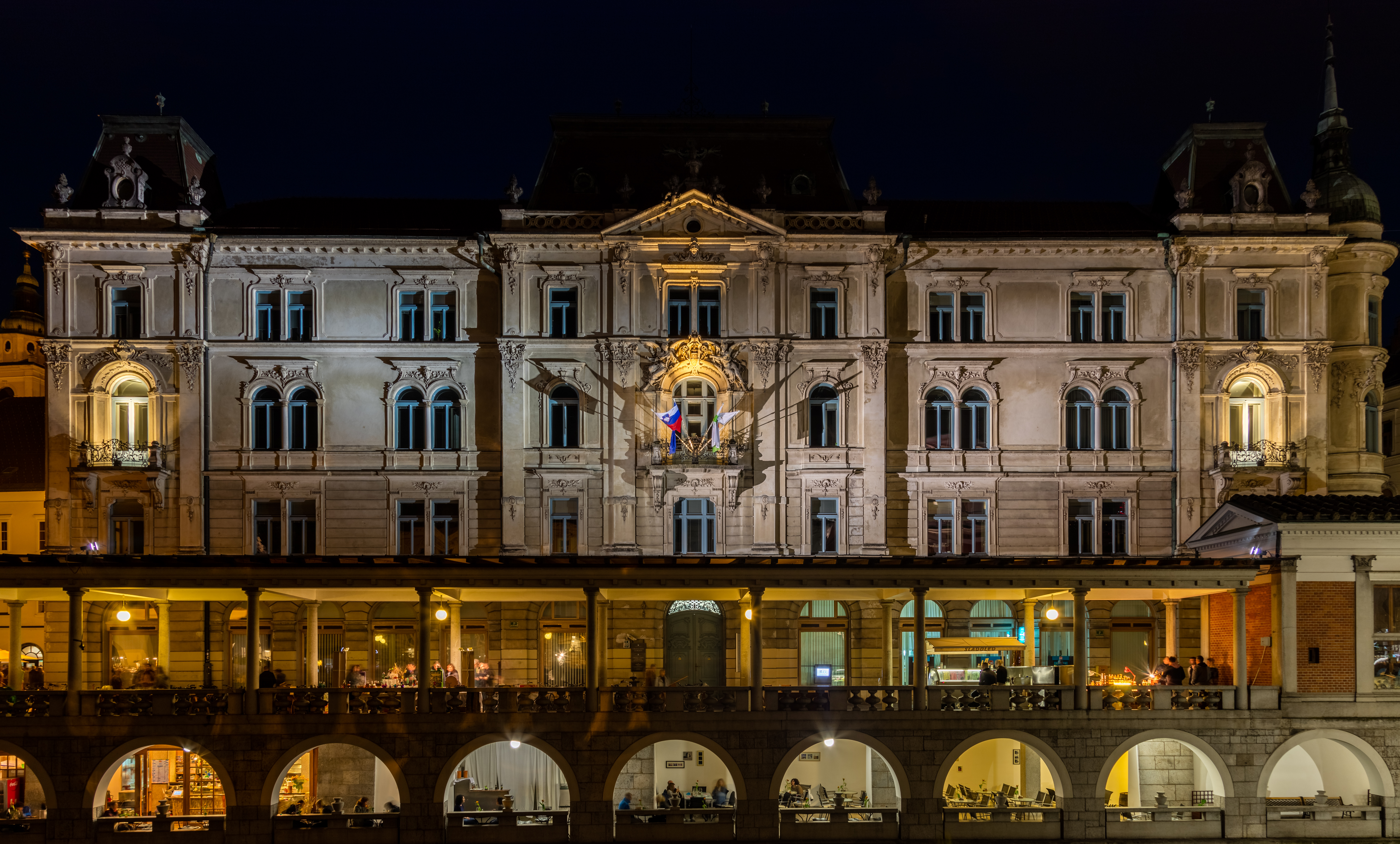
View of the Kresija Palace above Plečnik's arcades

The Kresija Building or Kresija Palace (Slovene: palača Kresija) is a building that along the Philip Mansion marks the entrance to the old town of Ljubljana, the capital of Slovenia. It stands at the Adamič and Lunder Embankment (Adamič-Lundrovo nabrežje) on the right bank of the Ljubljanica immediately downstream of the Triple Bridge, bordering Pogačar Square (Pogačarjev trg), Stritar Street (Stritarjeva ulica), and Maček Street (Mačkova ulica). Until 2007, the building housed the Ljubljana Center Administrative Unit. Now, there are municipal offices, the Kresija Gallery, and the Ljubljana visitor centre.

== History ==
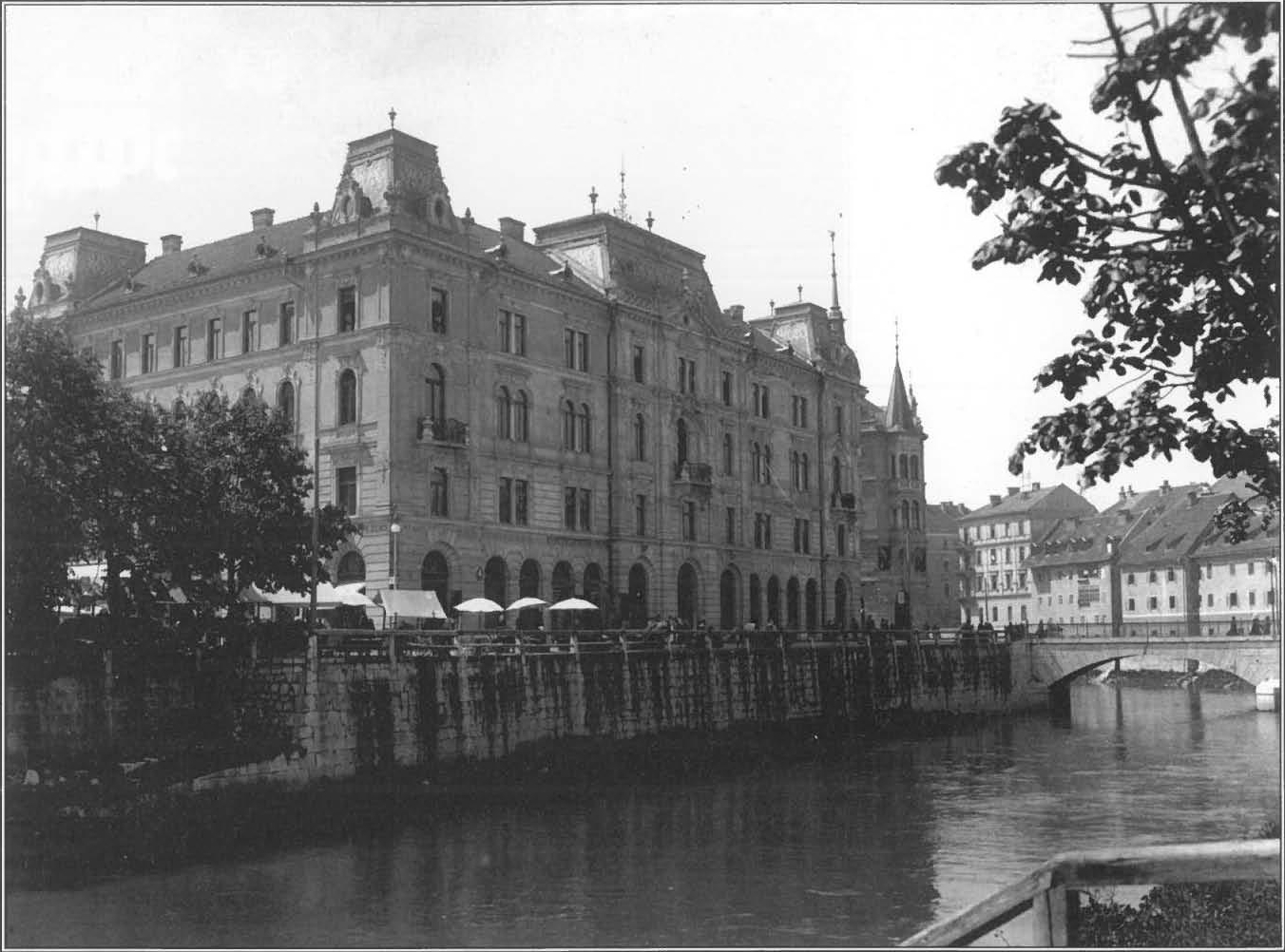
The Kresija Building in 1898

The name of the building derives from the German Kreisamt, referring to the administrative office of the local Austro-Hungarian Kreis or district. Prior to the 1895 Ljubljana earthquake, there was a hospital and school building at the site. It housed a maternity hospital, a midwifery school as the first healthcare institution where courses took place in Slovene as well as a surgery repetition school established in 1753 by the physician Gerard van Swieten. Through the first half of the 19th century, there were shops and apartments in the building and the Ljubljana district office occupied its first floor. St. Elizabeth's Church stood next to it until 1831.

== Architecture ==
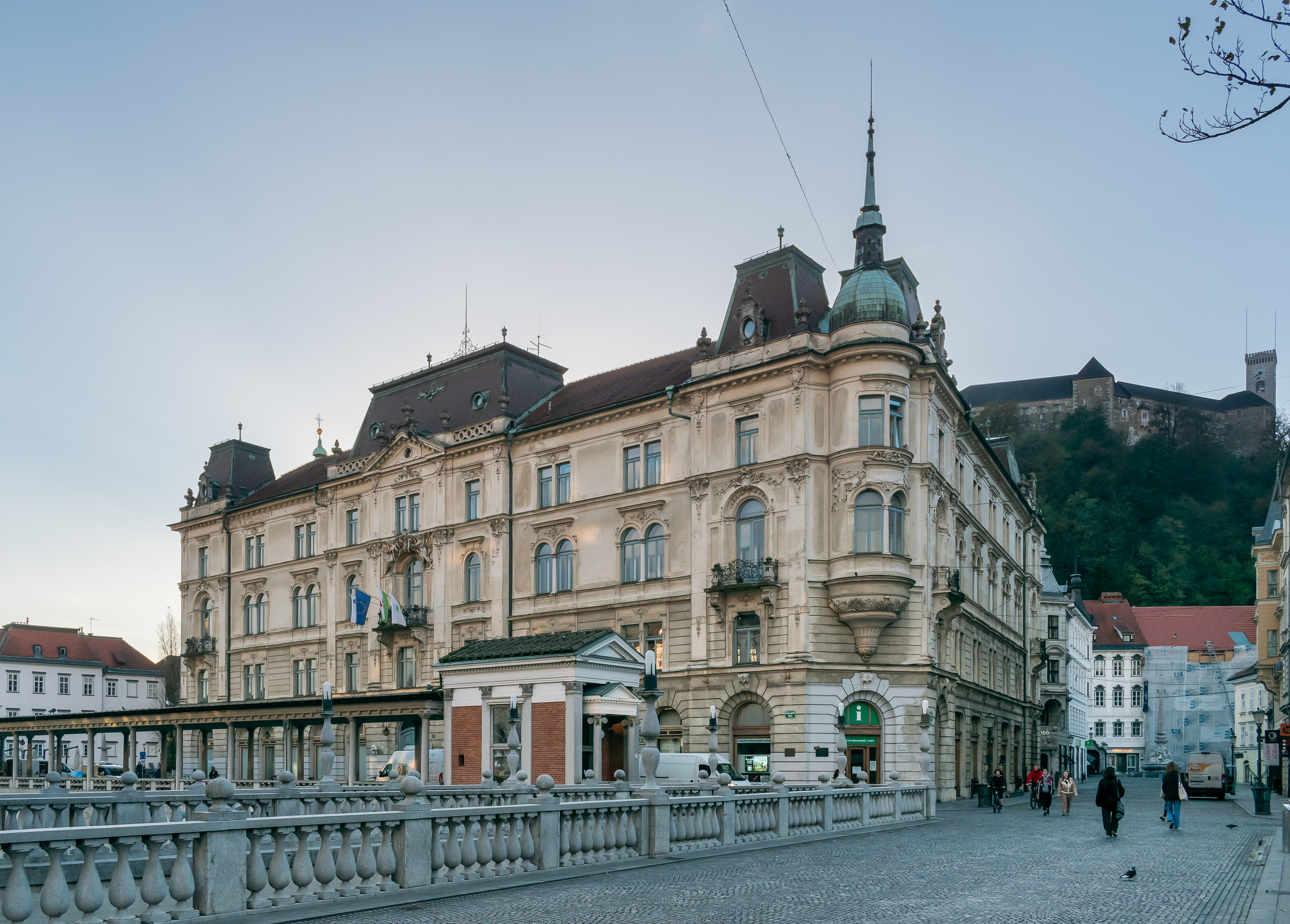
View from the Triple Bridge

The building has an irregular square plan and an inner court. It is noted for its Neo-Renaissance façades and interior. The decoration reminds of the Baroque. It was designed by the Graz architect Leopold Theyer and erected in 1897 and 1898, after the earthquake in 1895. The entrance portal of the building faces the Adamič and Lunder Embankment. There is a balcony with a wrought iron fence above it, and above the balcony, there is a coat of arms of the town of Ljubljana in a cartouche, encased with a sculpture of a genius on each side. The genii are work of the sculptor Alojzij Repič (1866–1941).

== Memorials ==
Since 1999, the southwestern façade of the Kresija Building has been adorned with two busts facing Stritar Street: a bust of the Protestant grammarian Adam Bohorič and a bust of the 17th-century physician Marko Gerbec. Below a turret at the northwestern corner, a plaque was installed in 2005 in remembrance of the Manoeuvre Structures of National Protection, a paramilitary force that secretly operated in the building in 1991 and contributed to the achievement of Slovenian independence. In 2008, another plaque was installed, dedicated to the Ljubljana Coordination Group of Independence Efforts in 1991.
