= Mihajlo Rostohar =

Slovenian psychologist, author and educator

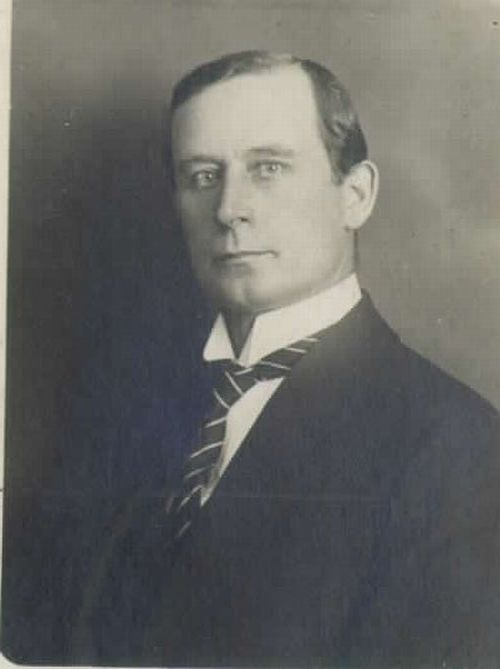
- Mihajlo Rostohar
- Born: June 30, 1878; Brege, Krško, Austria-Hungary
- Died: August 5, 1966 (aged 88); Golek, Krško, Yugoslavia
- Occupations: psychologist, author and educator
- Known for: playing an important role during the creation of the State of Slovenes, Croats and Serbs and the establishment of the University of Ljubljana.

Mihajlo Rostohar (July 30, 1878 – August 5, 1966) was a Slovenian psychologist, author and educator, who played an important role during the creation of the State of Slovenes, Croats and Serbs. Together with Ivan Hribar and Danilo Majaron, he had a crucial role in the establishment of the University of Ljubljana.

== Biography ==
He was born in a peasant family in Brege near Krško, then part of the Austro-Hungarian Duchy of Carniola and baptized Michael Rostohar. He attended high school (gymnasium) in Ljubljana and Kranj. He studied philosophy at the University of Graz with Alexius Meinong and later in Vienna, where he graduated in 1905. After working for a year as a supplementary high school teacher in Villach, he decided to pursue an academic career, following the advice of the Austrian philosopher Friedrich Jodl. He continued his studies in Prague, Leipzig (under the supervision of Wilhelm Wundt), Halle and Berlin. He obtained his habilitation at the Charles University of Prague.

After participating in the Italian campaign during World War I, he was involved in the formation of the State of Slovenes, Croats and Serbs in 1918. In 1919, he moved to Czechoslovakia, where he continued his academic career. After the Nazi German takeover of Bohemia and Moravia in 1939, he returned to Slovenia. After World War Two, he went back to Czechoslovakia, but returned to Yugoslavia in 1948.

He died in Golek near Krško in Slovenia.

An elementary school in Krško is named after him as well as roads. One of his busts stands in front of the University of Ljubljana, in recognition of his important role in forming the university, creating its Faculty of Psychology and having declared independence from the Austro-Hungarian Empire from the University's balcony.

=== Political career ===
Rostohar was active in the Slovene public life. Together with many other Slovene students from Prague, he helped introducing the political and social thought of Tomáš G. Masaryk to the Slovene Lands. He was close to progressive ideas, but unlike many other Slovene followers of Masaryk, he did not join the Social democratic party, but moved closer to national liberal positions.

During the First Balkan War, he publicly supported the idea of an autonomous Albania, with similar arguments as the Austria-Hungarian diplomacy. Because of this, he was attacked by the Slovene language press. In Rostohar's defense, the writer Ivan Cankar produced his famous lecture Slovenes and Yugoslavs, delivered in Ljubljana in 1913.

At the end of First World War there were numerous military units of the Army of Austria-Hungary on the territory of the Duchy of Carniola. Many of these soldiers and officers were Slovenians. During October 1918 there were mass desertions among them. On October 28, 1918, members of the Slovenian National council gathered in the hotel Union and agreed to organize a political rally on Congress Square for the next day. Despite the fact that soldiers and officers were not allowed to participate in the rally on October 29, 1918, around 200 soldiers and officers were in the crowd. Mihajlo Rostohar climbed to the balcony, where leaders of the rally spoke to the gathered people, and shouted:

“We soldiers renounce Austria and swear obedience to the state of our nation, to Yugoslavia!”

Then, on the night of October 29, 1918, he gathered some other Slovenian soldiers and officers, and also soldiers and officers from the 53rd regiment from Zagreb who got off the train that was transporting them through Ljubljana and joined them. Together with prisoners of war from Serbia and Russia they had liberated, there were around 600 of them. Rostohar used them to surround the barracks in Kodeljevo and disarm a battalion of the Austro-Hungarian army from Hungary on the same night.

After the first success in taking over control of the Ljubljana, Slovenian officers and soldiers were very much afraid of the army under control of the Austro-Hungarian field marshal Svetozar Borojević. Therefore, Rostohar organized Slovenian officers to prepare flyers printed in different languages to invite soldiers under command of Svetozar Borojević to go peacefully home, and not to start conflicts. Those activities helped in the peaceful take over of the control of Ljubljana.

=== Psychologist career ===
Rostohar studied in Vienna and Graz under professor Alexius Meinong, and he received his PhD in Vienna in 1906 after defending his thesis — Über die Hypothese. Ihre wissenschaftliche Bedeutung. (About the hypothesis. Its scientific importance.). He also studied in Prague where he started teaching in 1911 in Prague as associate professor at the Faculty of Arts of Charles University, after he defended his work on logic — Theory of Hypothetical Judgement in 1910. In 1919 he was one of the initiators to establish the University of Ljubljana and wrote the University's first Statute, to become its first dean and establish the first Psychological Institute in Slovenia. Despite all these activities he was not elected and he left Ljubljana, Slovenia for Brno at Masaryk University where he was teaching until 1939 and after Second World War till 1948. At the Masaryk University he established the Institute of Psychology in 1926 from where came the ideas and principles of the Gestalt psychology. Rostohar also followed the ideas of the Leipzig school (Wilhelm Wundt). In the book Psychology as a Science of Subjective Reality, he evolved the term psychological structure which he considered to be the basic creative and dynamic principle, oriented toward the formation of psychological wholes (Rostohar, 1950, p. 116). Gestalt-oriented articles of the Brno’s group were mostly released in the journal Psychology which was published from 1935 to 1950. It was edited by Rostohar until 1948. Rostohar's ideas were precursors of many contemporary psychological theories. Many of his theories and experiments were the foundation for further work in psychology. He is described as Piaget before Piaget, Chomsky before Chomsky, Atkinson before Atkinson, and much more. Rostohar participated in the Brno’s Society for Research in Child; he became its chairman in 1926. Rostohar was the main organizer of the pedological congresses where members of the Psychological Institute could present their Gestalt-oriented studies. In 1931, Rostohar presented his theory on child development. In 1937, Rostohar presented his research on a child’s creative fantasy and its relationship to the apperception of new images. In 1953, Rostohar presented his theory on language development.

From 1948, Rostohar taught at the University of Ljubljana where he was head and thought until his death. of the Psychology department. He was author of many works published in Czech, German, French, Serbo-Croatian and Slovenian.

Rostohar used his professional education to analyze the moral meaning of nation. He believed that the core of nationality is the awareness of belonging and the feeling that such awareness generates.

== Selected works ==
- Rostohar M., Uvod v znanstveno mišljenje (1910)
- Rostohar M., Theorie hypotetickeho soudu - Theory of Hypothetical Judgement (1910)
- Rostohar M., Nationality and its moral significance (1913)
- Rostohar M., Experimentálni zkoumání o reprodukci barevných kvalit. Lékařské rozhledy (1914)
- Rostohar M., O synaesthesiich sluchovych I. Lekařské rozhledy (Praha) (1914)
- Rostohar M., O synaesthesiich sluchovych II. Lekařské rozhledy (Praha) (1915)
- Rostohar M., Za novi socializem (1923)
- Rostohar M., O vývoji dětskych představ. Třetl sjezd pro výzkum dítěte. Praha (1927)
- Rostohar M., Studie z vývojové psychologie. Dil 1 (1928)
- Rostohar M., L'evolution de la representation visuelle a partir de l'impression initiate. L'annee psychologique, Paris (1931)
- Rostohar M., Jak se vyvíjí u detí konkretní pojem předmetu. Ctvrtý sjezd pro výzkum dí těte. Bratislava (1931)
- Rostohar M., Psychologcké zaklady počátečního čtení s praktickým návodem ke čtení (1934)
- Rostohar M., Struktura u duševním živote, Psychologie Brno (1935)
- Rostohar M., O psychologické pojetí představy. Psychologie (1937)
- Psychologie sociàlni (1948)
- Rostohar M., Psychopatologie (1948)
- Rostohar M., Psychologie jako věda o subjektivní skutečnosti (1950)
- Rostohar M., Obča psiholgija (1951)
- Rostohar M., Socialna psihologija (1952)
- Rostohar M., Pedopsihologija (1953)
- Rostohar M., Stavek in misel. Razprave Slovenske akademij znanosti in umetnosti, Ljubljana (1953)
- Rostohar M., Osnove obče psihologije (1964)
- Rostohar M, Osnove obce psihologije. Ljubljana (1964)
- Rostohar M., Osnove socialne psihologije (1965)
- Rostohar M., Psihologija (1966)
- Rostohar M., Strukture u duševnom životu. Zbomik saopcenja i plenarning predavanja, Zagreb (1966)
