= List of earthquakes in Slovenia =

This incomplete list lists earthquakes that had epicentres within the current borders of Slovenia or otherwise had a significant impact on Slovenia.

| Date | Epicenter | Mag. | Intensity | Deaths | Notes |
|---|---|---|---|---|---|
| 25 January 1348 | Furlania | 6.9 | X | 10,000 | Felt at a maximum intensity of VIII–IX in modern-day Slovenia. See 1348 Friuli earthquake |
| 26 March 1511 | Idrija | 6.9 | X | 3,000 | Felt as far as Switzerland and Slovakia, damaged buildings and fortifications as far as Italy, Croatia and Bosnia. See 1511 Idrija earthquake |
| 11 February 1699 | Metlika | 5.0 | VIII | | Caused significant damage in Croatia, including the destruction of the Medvedgrad and Veliki Kalnik fortresses and the Pauline monastery in Zagreb. |
| 14 April 1895 | Janče | 6.1 M_{L} | VIII–IX | 21 | The earthquake severely damaged 10 percent of Ljubljana's housing stock, and caused an architectural revival of the city. See 1895 Ljubljana earthquake |
| 29 January 1917 | Brežice | 5.7 | VIII | | |
| 31 January 1956 | Ilirska Bistrica | 5.1 | VII | | |
| 19 May 1963 | Litija | 4.9 | VII | | |
| 20 June 1974 | Kozje region | 5.1 | VII–VIII | | About 5,300 buildings were damaged and around 1,000 had to be torn down. The earthquake was followed by rainfall, which aggravated landslides caused by the quake. |
| 6 May 1976 | Gemona, Italy | 6.5 | X | | The epicentre was in Furlania, slightly outside Slovenia. Felt at EMS-98 intensity VIII–IX in Slovenia and followed by an intensity VIII aftershock in September. 990 people died from the earthquake, none of them in Slovenia. See 1976 Friuli earthquake |
| 16 July 1977 | Preddvor | 4.6 | VI–VII | | |
| 3 July 1982 | Savinja Valley | 3.9 | VI–VII | | At a depth of 4 km (2.5 mi), the earthquake was very shallow and caused significant damage in Šempeter v Savinjski Dolini. |
| 22 May 1995 | Ilirska Bistrica | 4.7 | VI | | Preceded by a deeper magnitude 4.4 foreshock. |
| 12 April 1998 | Krn–Lepena | 5.7 | VII-VIII | | In upper Soča Valley. |
| 12 July 2004 | Golobar | 4.9 M_{L} | VI-VII | | In upper Soča Valley. |
| 29 December 2020 | Petrinja (Croatia) | 6.4 | V–VI | | Damage to facades, roofs, and chimneys from the southeastern towns of Krško and Brežice and the old town of Kostanjevica na Krki. See 2020 Petrinja earthquake |
Note: The inclusion criteria for adding events are based on WikiProject Earthquakes' notability guideline that was developed for stand alone articles. The principles described also apply to lists. In summary, only damaging, injurious, or deadly events should be recorded.

== See also ==
- List of earthquakes in Croatia
- List of earthquakes in Italy
