= Brege =

- Location in Slovenia
- Coordinates: 45°55′12.92″N 15°29′58.9″E
- Country: Slovenia
- Traditional region: Lower Carniola
- Statistical region: Lower Sava
- Municipality: Krško

Area
  - Total: 1.23 km^{2} (0.47 sq mi)
- Elevation: 155.2 m (509 ft)

Population (2002)
  - Total: 188

Brege (pronounced [ˈbɾeːɡɛ]) is a small village south of Krško in eastern Slovenia. The area is part of the traditional region of Lower Carniola. It is now included with the rest of the municipality in the Lower Sava Statistical Region.

== Name ==
Brege was attested in written sources as Rayn in 1358 and Rain c. 1442.

== Notable people ==
Notable people that were born or lived in Brege include the following:

- Mihajlo Rostohar (1878–1966), psychologist, author, educator
