= 1895 Ljubljana earthquake =

Seismic event in Slovenia

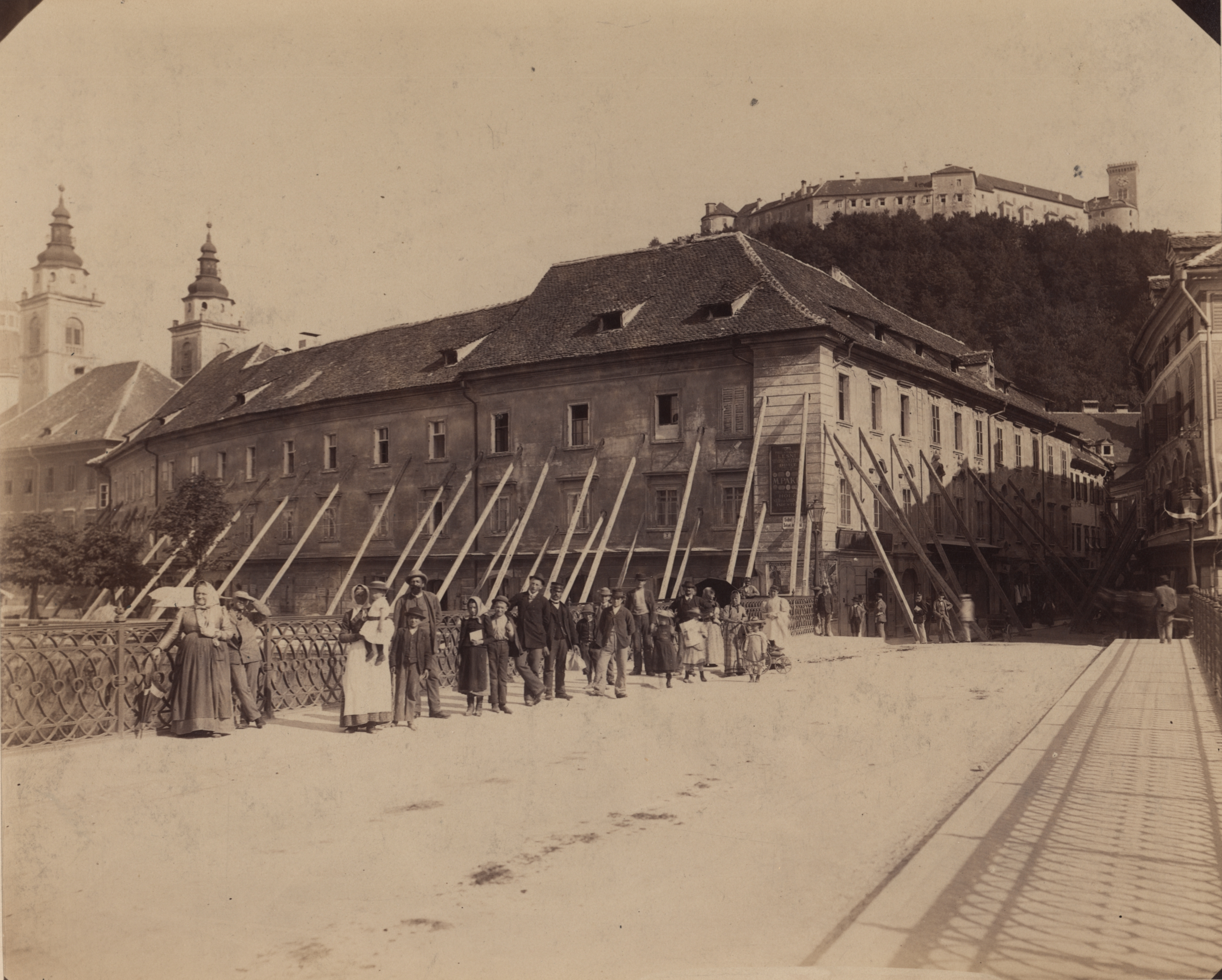
- Hospice Street (Špitalska ulica; now Stritar Street, Stritarjeva ulica)
- UTC time: 1895-04-14 22:17
- Local date: 14 April 1895
- Local time: 23:17
- Magnitude: 6.1 (M_{w})
- Depth: 16 km (9.9 mi)
- Epicenter: 46°3′8.83″N 14°42′39.27″E
- Areas affected: the area of Ljubljana with a radius of 18 km (11 mi) (most severely); lesser damage in a radius of 50 km (31 mi)
- Max. intensity: EMS-98 VIII–IX
- Casualties: 21 dead

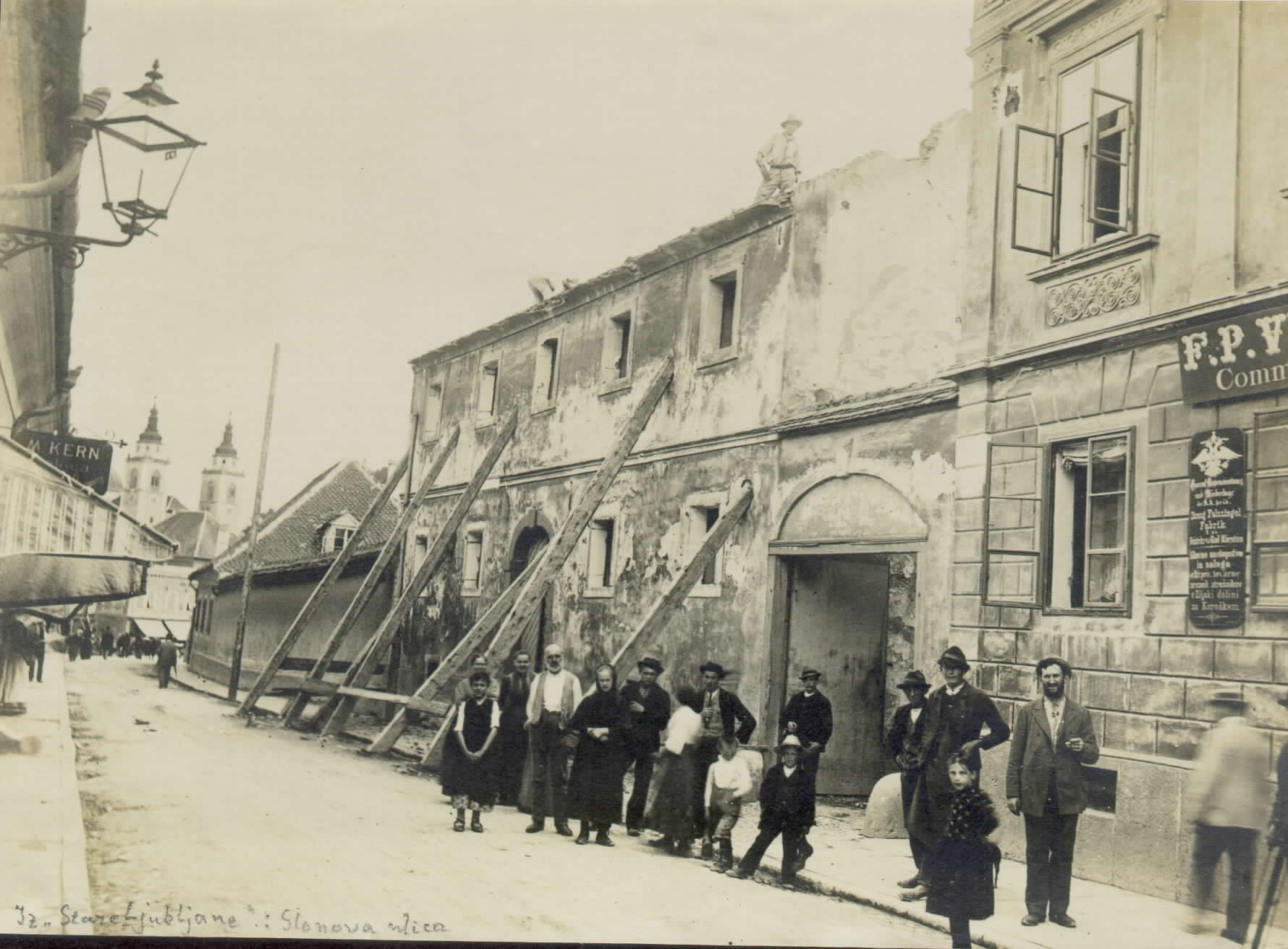
Wolf Street (Wolfova ulica)

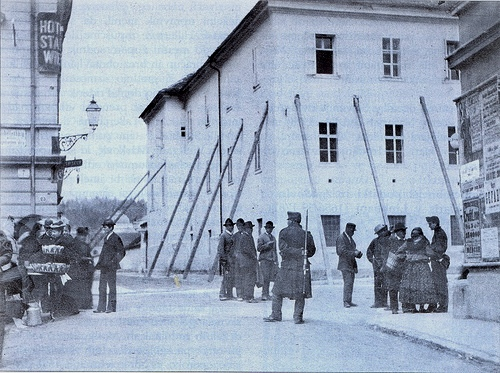
The Convent of the Poor Clares at the site of today's Bank of Slovenia

On 14 April 1895, a 6.1 magnitude earthquake struck Ljubljana, the capital and largest city of Carniola, a crown land of Austria-Hungary and the capital of modern-day Slovenia. It was the most, and the last, destructive earthquake in the history of Ljubljana.

== Earthquake ==
With a moment magnitude of 6.1 and a maximum EMS Intensity of VIII–IX, the earthquake struck at 22:17 UTC (23:17 local time). The earthquake's epicenter was located in Janče, about 16 kilometres (10 mi) to the east of the Ljubljana downtown. The focus was 16 kilometres (10 mi) deep. The shock was felt in a circle with a radius of 350 kilometres (220 mi) and an area of 385,000 square kilometres (149,000 sq mi), reaching as far away as Assisi, Florence, Vienna, and Split. More than 100 aftershocks followed in the next ten days.

=== Casualties and damage ===
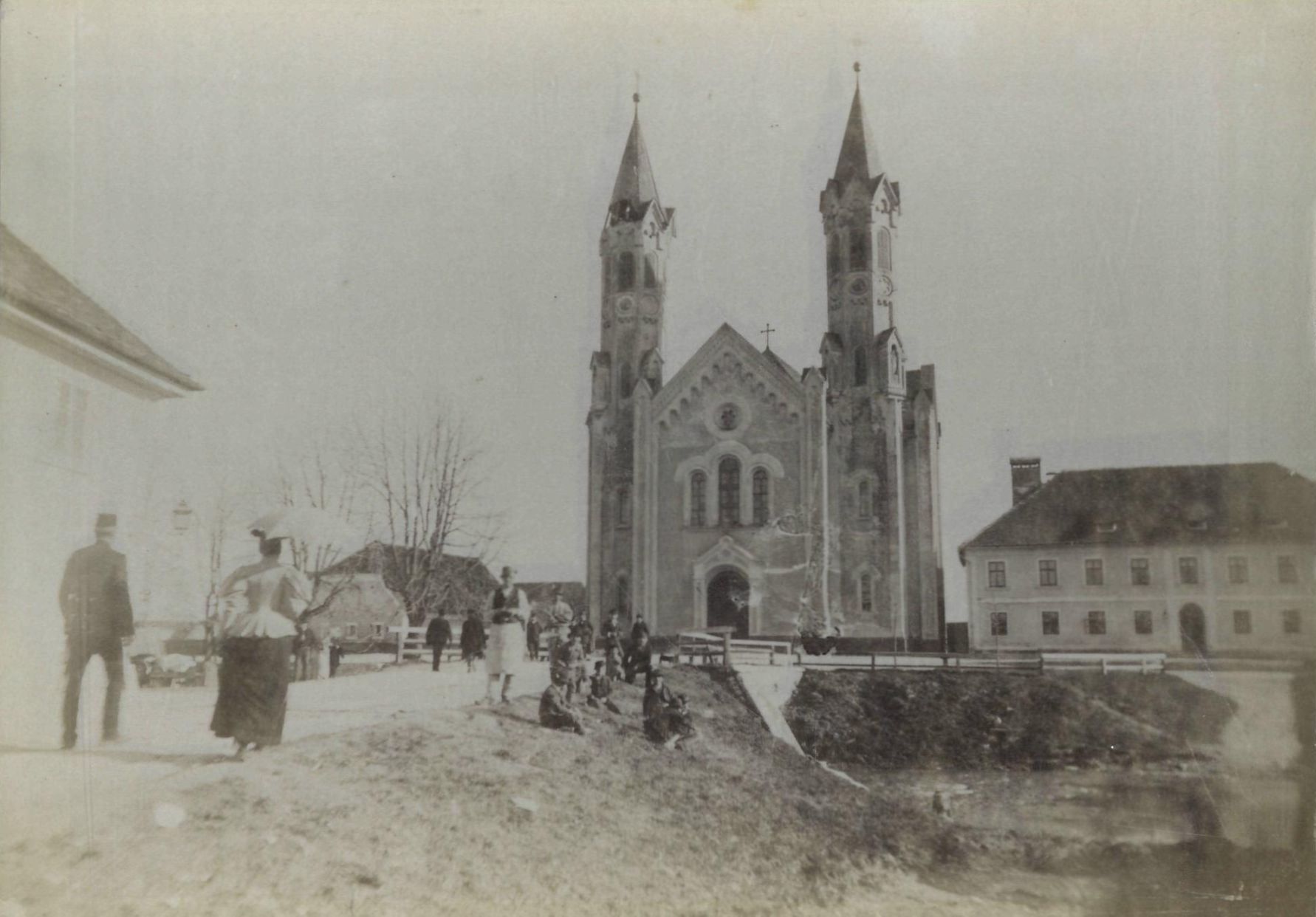
Ljubljana earthquake in aftermath

At the time, Ljubljana's population was some 31,000, with around 1,400 buildings. The earthquake directly caused 21 death casualties, two people died later while clearing the rubble and three children died several days after the earthquake due to the severe cold in their temporary accommodation. The lack of food, poor living conditions and rainy weather meant that diseases, especially diphtheria, spread rapidly. The elderly and children in particular were dying.

About ten percent of buildings were damaged or destroyed in the city. The largest damage was caused in a circle with a radius of 18 km (11 mi), from Ig to Vodice, while lesser damage occurred in a radius of 50 km (31 mi) from the epicenter. At Vodnik Square (Vodnikov trg), an old monastery, which contained a diocesan girls' college and a library was sufficiently damaged that it had to be razed, and the site eventually was turned into an outdoor market (Ljubljana Central Market, Osrednja ljubljanska tržnica), now an important site in the city. The damage was estimated to 7 million florins.

=== Response ===
The next morning, the Municipal Council adopted emergency measures to assist the worst-affected victims, to direct the police force in extra security measures, and to direct the police force to inspect the damaged houses. All the city's schools were temporarily closed, and some factories temporarily ceased operation. A few days later, emergency shelters were created for the homeless. Many citizens of Ljubljana left the city as refugees. Lack of food was quickly felt in the city, and five emergency kitchens were established, which were free or low cost and distributed several thousand hot meals each day. Other areas of the Austro-Hungarian Empire, especially Vienna, the Czech Lands and Croatia-Slavonia assisted in the aid. Among the individual members of the Municipal Council, the Liberal Nationalist Ivan Hribar, showed particular organizational abilities in providing aid. Shortly thereafter, he was elected mayor and organized the town's extensive reconstruction. The damage was substantial. Most houses were damaged on Hospice Street (Špitalska ulica, today Stritar Street, Stritarjeva ulica), where all houses were destroyed except for one, and the markets.

== Post-earthquake reconstruction ==
Until the event, Ljubljana had a provincial appearance. Expansion of the city and a widespread Vienna Secession architectural change began, which today is juxtaposed against the earlier Baroque style buildings that remain. Many buildings, such as the Mladika, were constructed in the aftermath. The rebuilding period between 1896 and 1910 is referred to as the "revival of Ljubljana" not just because of these architectural changes from which a great deal of the city dates back to today, but for reform of urban administration, health, education and tourism that followed. From 1895 to 1910, 436 new buildings were created and hundreds of buildings were renovated or extended in the Vienna Secession style. Most of Ljubljana's bridges, monuments, parks, and main buildings date back to the post-earthquake development. A chapel, dedicated to Our Lady of the Rosary, was erected in 1895 in Janče by the people of Ljubljana so that Mary would protect them from such disasters. In 1897, the first Austro-Hungarian seismological observatory was established in Ljubljana at Vega Street (Vegova ulica).

== See also ==
- List of historical earthquakes
- List of earthquakes in Slovenia
