= List of cemeteries in Slovenia =

- Žale – the largest cemetery in Ljubljana, Slovenia, burial site of many prominent Slovenes
- Navje cemetery – located in the Bežigrad district of Ljubljana, it is the burial site for prominent Slovenes; people buried in Navje include the playwright and historian Anton Tomaž Linhart, politicians Janez Bleiweis and Anton Korošec, philologist Jernej Kopitar, writer Fran Levstik, poet Valentin Vodnik, and many others. Some prominent non-Slovenes are buried in the cemetery as well, including the Czech inventor Josef Ressel and the Polish philologist Emil Korytko.
- Rožna Dolina Jewish Cemetery – located in the suburb of Rožna Dolina in the town of Nova Gorica, it is the largest Jewish cemetery in Slovenia. The Jewish-Italian philosopher Carlo Michelstaedter is buried there.

Military cemeteries:

- Italian Ossuary – located in Kobarid (Caporetto). It was built in 1938 for the Italian soldiers who died in the Battles of the Isonzo.
- Ukanc Military Cemetery – located in Bohinj. It was in usage from 1915 until 1917 by the Austrian soldiers fallen at the Isonzo Front.
