= Karl Deschmann =

Carniolan politician (1821–1889)

- 1865 portrait

Mayor of Ljubljana
- In office 1871–1874

Member of the Austrian House of Deputies
- In office 1873–1879

Member of the Austrian House of Deputies
- In office 1861–1867

Member of the Diet of the Duchy of Carniola

Personal details
- Born: 3 January 1821 Idrija, Duchy of Carniola, Austrian Empire
- Died: 11 March 1889 (aged 68) Ljubljana, Duchy of Carniola, Austria-Hungary
- Resting place: Navje Memorial Park
- Education: University of Vienna
- Occupation: Politician; natural scientist

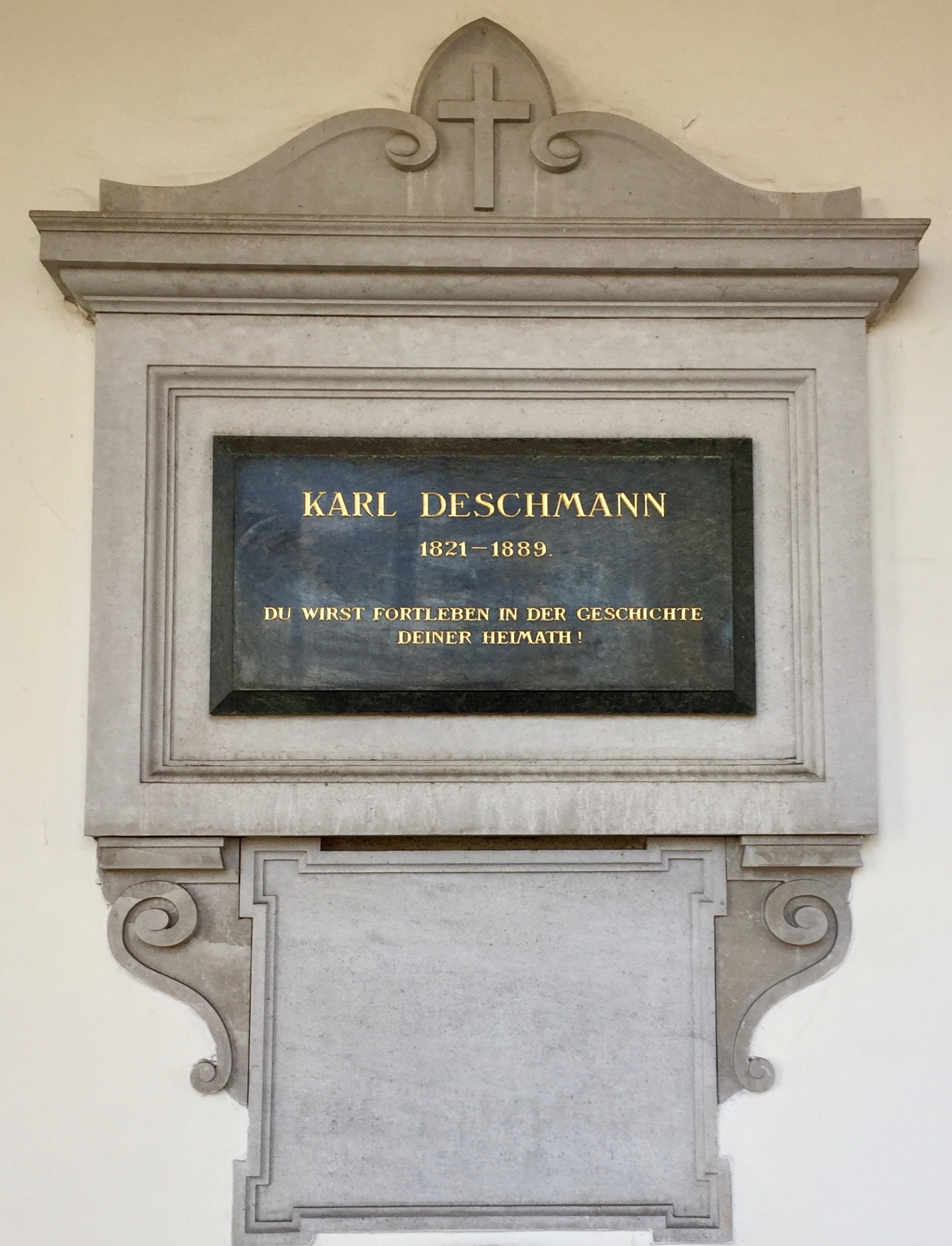
Tombstone of Karl Deschmann in Navje Memorial Park in Ljubljana

Karl Deschmann (Slovenized: Dragotin Dežman and Karel Dežman; 3 January 1821 – 11 March 1889), was a Carniolan politician and natural scientist. He was one of the most prominent personalities of the political, cultural, and scientific developments in the 19th-century Duchy of Carniola. He is considered one of the fathers of modern archeology in what is today Slovenia. He also made important contributions in botany, zoology, geology, and mineralogy. He was the first director of the Provincial Museum of Carniola, now the National Museum of Slovenia. Due to his switch from Slovene liberal nationalism to Austrian centralism and pro-German cultural stances, he became a symbol of national renegadism.

== Early life and education ==
He was born to an upper middle class Slovene family in Idrija, Duchy of Carniola (now in Slovenia), and baptized Carl Deschmann. After his father's death in 1824, he moved to Ljubljana, where he was raised by his uncle Mihael Dežman, who was a financial supporter of the Slovene national revival, and a personal friend of the philologist Franc Metelko.

After finishing high school in Ljubljana and Salzburg in 1839, he enrolled in the University of Vienna, where he studied medicine and law. In Vienna, he soon came under the influence of Slovene romantic nationalists, and became part of the Slovene radical youth. Among others, he participated in the public funeral of the Polish exile patriot Emil Korytko in Ljubljana, and was chosen to carry his coffin.

During the Revolution of 1848, he supported the United Slovenia program, and helped organize the boycott of the elections to the Frankfurt Parliament in the Slovene Lands. In this period, he started using the name Dragotin, a Slavic version of the name Karel 'Charles'.

== Early career ==
In 1849, he returned to Ljubljana. Initially, he taught at the local state secondary school. In 1852, he was appointed director of the Carniolan Provincial Museum. He continued to be active in the Slovene national movement, working with figures such as Janez Bleiweis and Franz Miklosich. Among other things, he wrote a bibliography of the poet Valentin Vodnik, and compiled the natural science terminology for Maks Pleteršnik's Slovene–German dictionary. As an author of articles supporting progressive and national liberal ideals, he influenced many young Slovene political activists, such as Fran Erjavec and Fran Levec.

== Political career ==
Deschmann began his political career in the Slovene National Movement, but in the mid-1850s, he became alienated from it, disenchanted with the conservatism and pragmatism of its leaders Janez Bleiweis and of Lovro Toman. Nevertheless, he was elected as a Slovene nationalist MP at the Austrian Parliament in 1861. He however did not join the Slovene national caucus, but joined the Bohemian federalists. He supported the peaceful coexistence of Slovene and German culture in the Slovene Lands. In 1862, Deschmann's break with the Slovene national movement became manifest when he published a brochure entitled 'The German Culture in Carniola' (Das Deutschtum in Krain), in which he argued it is the duty of German culture to civilize and bring economic and political progress to Carniola, without Germanizing it.

Deschmann himself turned to more rigid and anti-Slovene positions in the late 1860s and early 1870s, accusing the Slovene nationalists of pan-Slavism, opposing the establishing of a Slovene language university, and the equality of Slovene in public administration. Deschmann's political evolution provoked fierce reactions in the Slovene public. The writer Janez Trdina compared him to Judas Iscariot. The Slovene press used his name as a synonym for national renegades.

Between 1871 and 1874, he served as mayor of Ljubljana. In 1873, he was re-elected to the Austrian Parliament on the list of the centralist liberal Austrian Constitutional Party (Verfassungspartei). After the death of Count Anton Alexander von Auersperg, Deschmann became the undisputed leader of the Constitutionalist Party in Carniola, and tried unsuccessfully to prevent its demise by attempting to forge an alliance with the national progressivist Young Slovene party.

== Death ==
He died in Ljubljana in 1889 of "gastric and hepatic degeneration" (Magen u. Leberentartung), and he was buried in St. Christopher's Cemetery in the Bežigrad district.

== Scholarly achievements ==
Deschmann was a prominent archaeologist. From 1852 till 1889, he was the curator for archeology and also the first director of the Provincial Museum of Carniola. In 1875, he started archeological excavations on the Ljubljana Marsh, which brought to the discovery of prehistorical pile dwellings at Ig. These are now protected as a UNESCO World Heritage Site. He also discovered many important Iron Age settlements in Lower Carniola.

Deschmann was also interested in ethnology. In 1868, he was the first one to publish the legend of the Goldhorn, which he heard in one of his expeditions to the Julian Alps.

== Sources ==
- Dragotin Lončar, Dragotin Dežman in slovenstvo (Ljubljana, 1930)
- Janez Cvirn, Kdor te sreča, naj te sune, če ti more, v zobe plune: Dragotin Dežman in slovenstvo In Zgodovina za vse 14/2 (2007), pp. 38–56.
