= Zois Mansion =

Historic building in Slovenia

Coordinates: 46°2′46.56″N 14°30′17.72″E

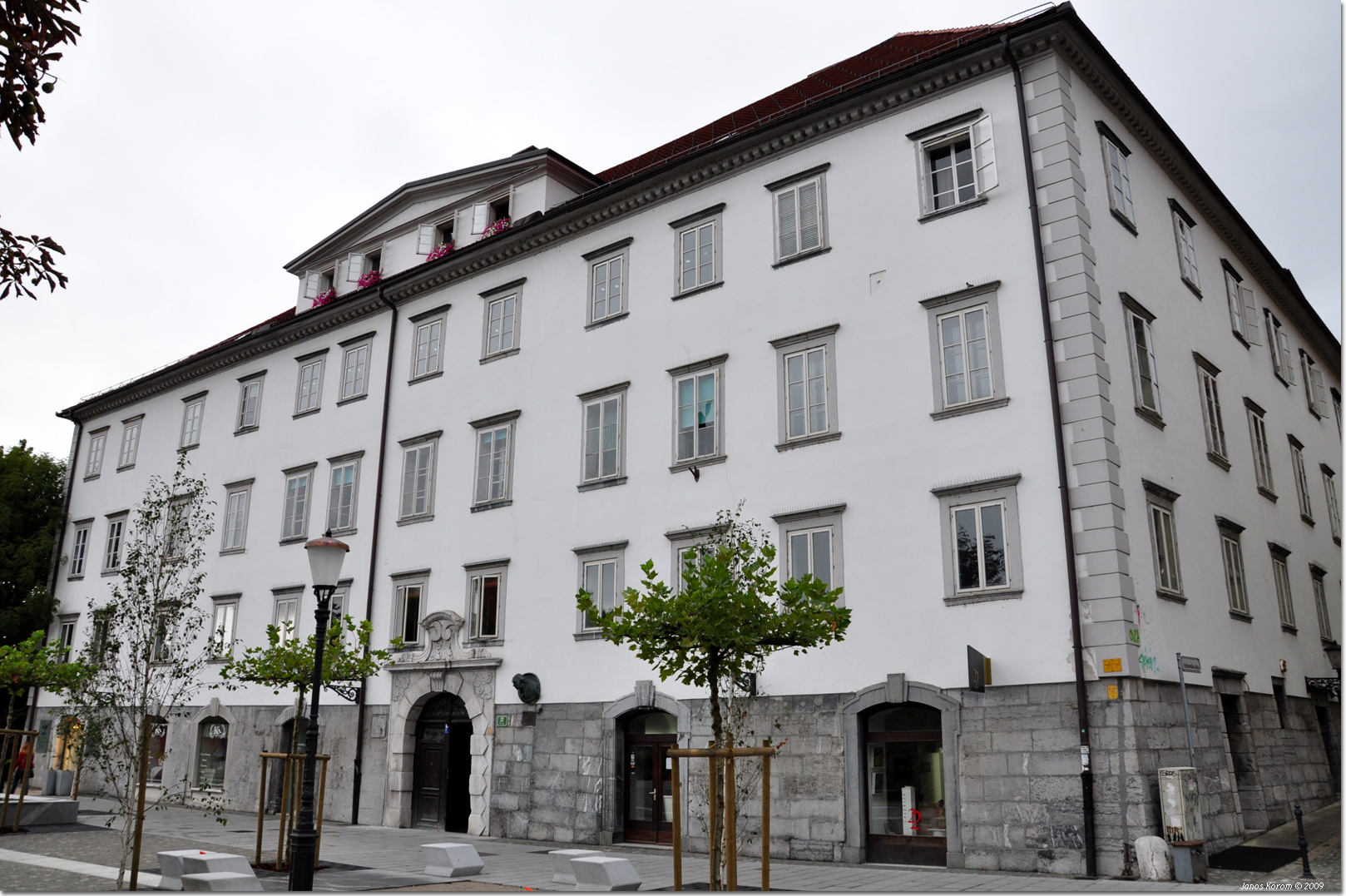
Zois Mansion on the bank of the Ljubljanica River in Ljubljana

Zois Mansion (Slovene: Zoisova palača) is a mansion in Ljubljana, the capital of Slovenia. It stands in the Center District, at Breg, a street on the west (left) bank of the Ljubljanica, between Teutonic Street (Križevniška ulica) to the north and Zois Street (Zoisova cesta) to the south. The mansion served as residence of Baron Sigmund Zois, a leading figure of Enlightenment in the Slovene Lands of the Austrian monarchy and supporter of the revival of Slovene culture and literature.

The mansion was built between 1765 and 1805, combining until 1770 four older buildings, and then in 1805 another one. The facade was redesigned in the neoclassicist style in 1798. The monumental stone portal dates to 1589 and was made by the manson Abondio di Donino for the building of the town warehouse. It was redesigned in the 18th century, except for the keystone that has been built into facade left of the main entrance. It bears a relief of the coat of arms of the town that has also been ascribed to Donino. Right of the main entrance, there is a bronze bust of Sigmund Zois from 1993, work by the sculptor Mirsad Begić. In the mansion's yard stands an old fountain. Zois's tombstone is etched into the wall facing the yard.

Between the 1780s and the first decade of the 19th century, the mansion was used as the venue of the Slovene intellectual elite, which included the playwright and historian Anton Tomaž Linhart, poet and journalist Valentin Vodnik, philologists Jurij Japelj and Blaž Kumerdej, and linguist Jernej Kopitar.

== See also ==
- Brdo pri Kranju
