= Stožice =

Stožice may refer to:

== Czech Republic ==
- Stožice, Czech Republic, a municipality and village in the South Bohemian Region

== Slovenia ==
- Stožice (Ljubljana), a part of Ljubljana
  - Stožice Sports Park, a multi-use sports complex in Stožice
    - Stožice Stadium, a multi-purpose stadium in the sports park
    - Arena Stožice, a multi-purpose indoor arena in the sports park
- Nove Stožice, a housing development in Ljubljana
