= Anton Linhart =

Anton Linhart may refer to:

- Anton Tomaž Linhart (1756–1795), Slovene playwright and historian
- Anton "Toni" Linhart (1942–2013), Austrian football player
