= Anton Tomaž Linhart =

Carniolan playwright and historian

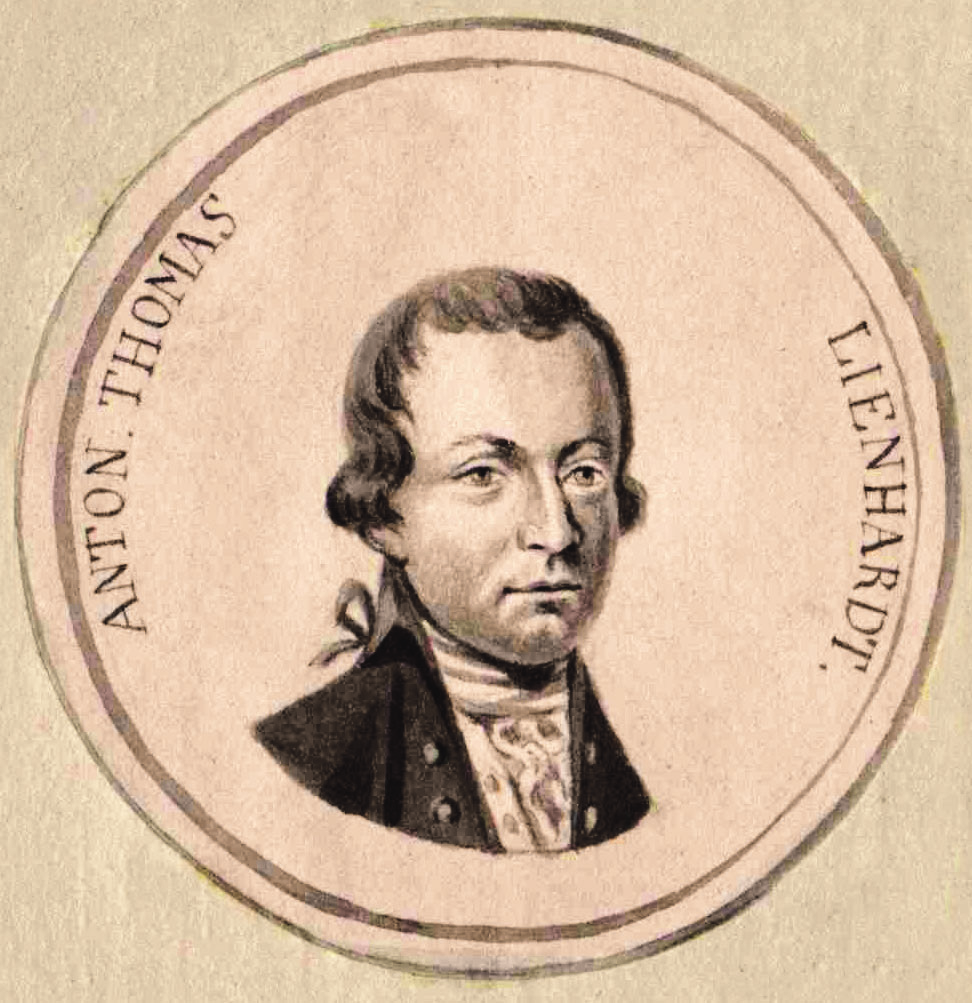
- The oldest known depiction of Linhart was discovered only in 2010 through an online search in the portrait collection of the Austrian National Library. It is the work of an unknown artist and dates to c. 1800.
- Born: Thomas Antonius Leanhorht; December 11, 1756; Radovljica, Carniola, Habsburg monarchy
- Died: July 14, 1795 (aged 38); Ljubljana, Habsburg monarchy
- Resting place: Navje, Ljubljana
- Occupations: Playwright, historian, archivist, school commissioner
- Known for: Author of the first play in Slovene (*Županova Micka*), father of Slovene historiography
- Parent(s): Wenceslaus Linhart and Theresia Kunstl

Anton Tomaž Linhart (December 11, 1756 – July 14, 1795) was a Carniolan playwright and historian, best known as the author of the first comedy and theatrical play in general in Slovene, Županova Micka (Micka, the Mayor's Daughter). He is also considered the father of Slovene historiography, since he was the first historian to write a history of all Slovenes as a unit, rejecting the previous concept which focused on single historical provinces. He was the first one to define the Slovenes as a separate ethnic group and set the foundations of Slovene ethnography.

== Biography ==
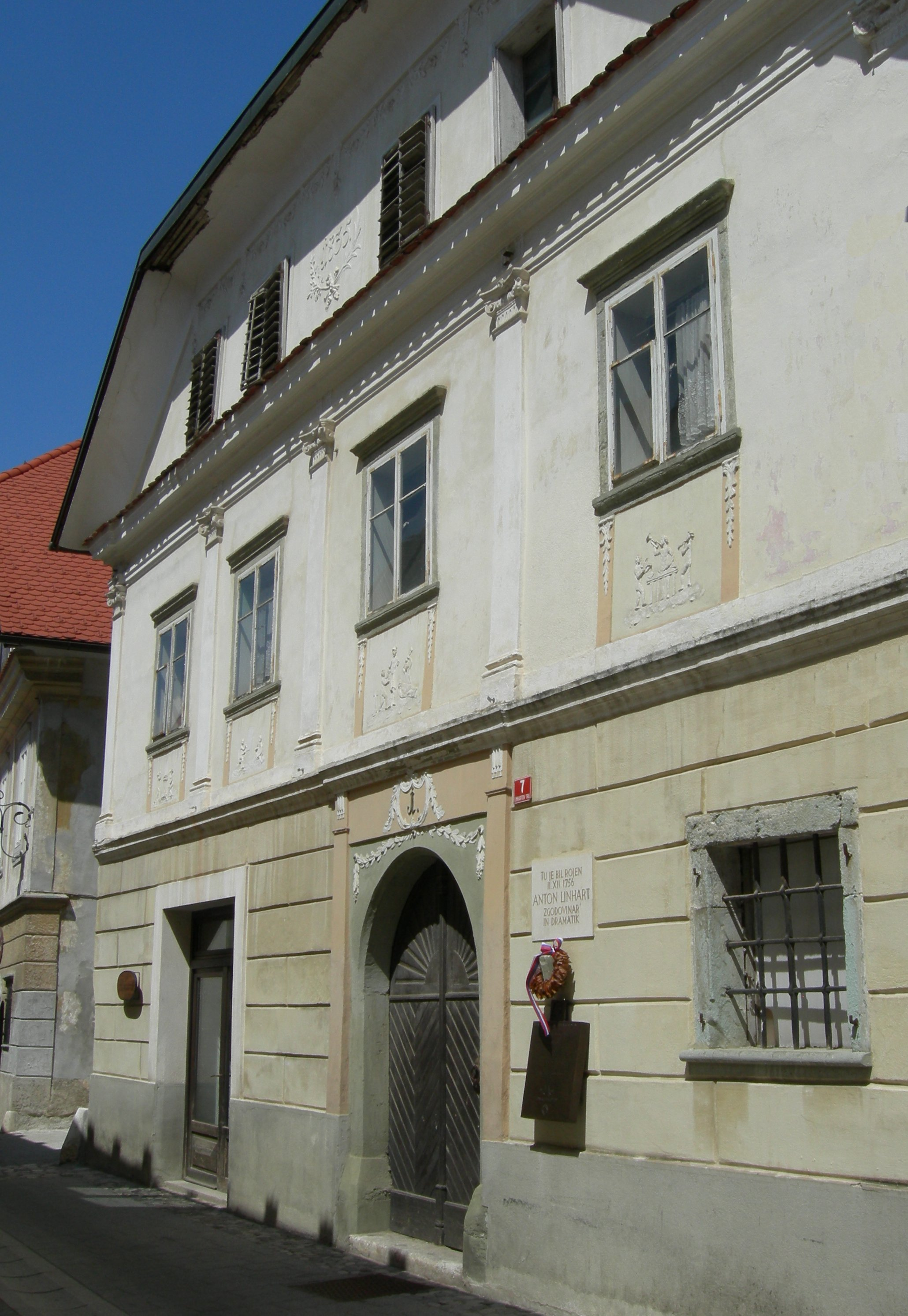
Anton Tomaž Linhart's birthplace (Radovljica, Slovenia)

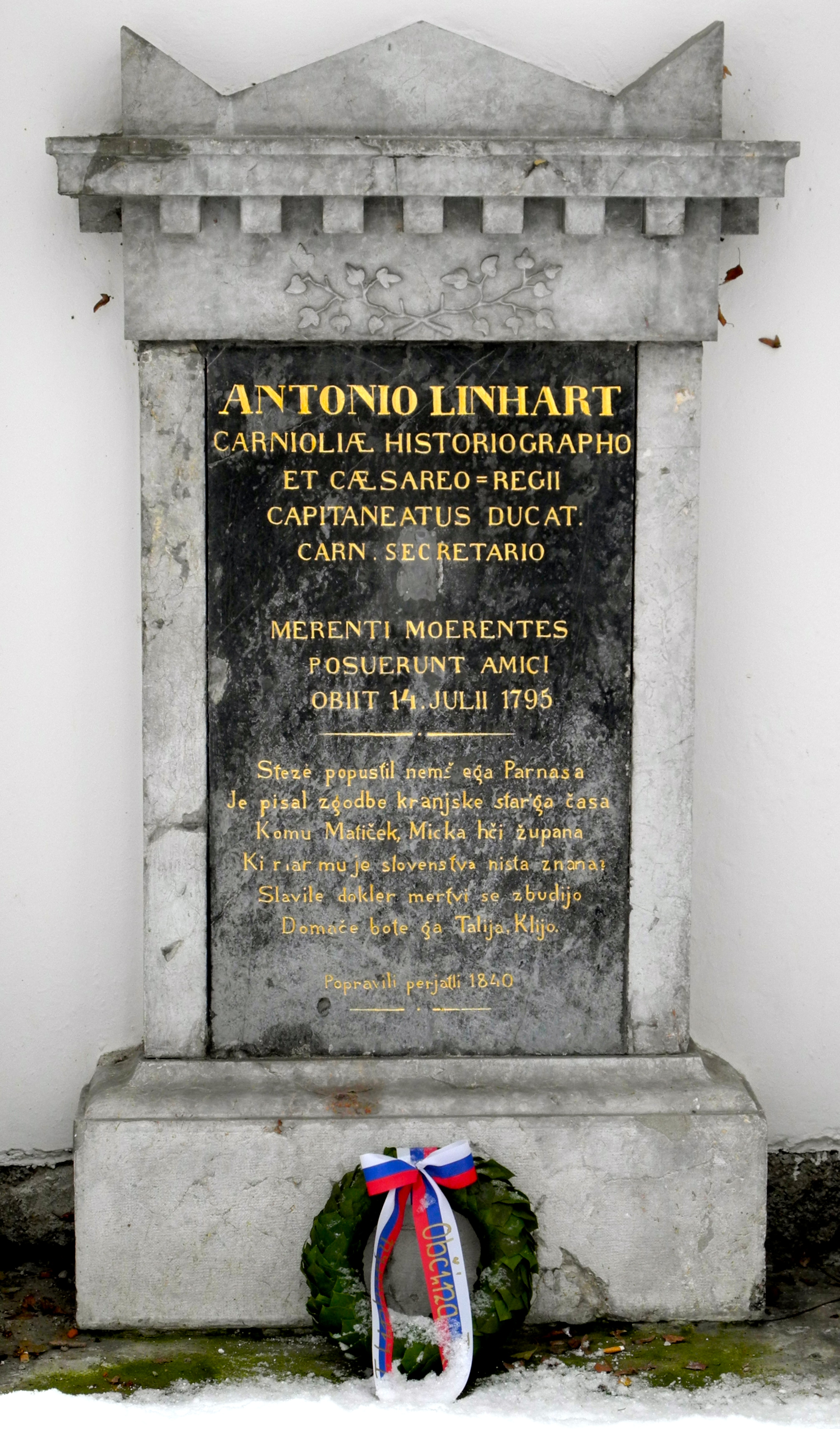
Tombstone of Anton Tomaž Linhart with verses by the poet France Prešeren in Navje memorial park in Ljubljana

Linhart was born in the Upper Carniolan town of Radovljica, at the time part of the Habsburg monarchy, and baptized Thomas Antonius Leanhorht. His father Wenceslaus was a Czech hosiery manufacturer who had moved to Carniola from Bohemia. Linhart's mother, Theresia née Kunstl, died when he was nine years old, and his father then married Agnes Kappus on June 8, 1767. His stepmother was a Carniolan (Slovenian) noblewoman from the family Kappus (also Kapus) von Pichelstein, a prosperous family which had for centuries lived at Kamna Gorica in Upper Carniola, where the family owned an iron foundry and an iron mine since the late Middle Ages, perhaps since the 12th century. Marcus Antonius Kappus von Pichelstein (1657–1717), worked as a Jesuit missionary in Sonora (i.e., the border region between today's United States and Mexico). From there he wrote letters to his friends in Vienna and to his relatives in Carniola In these letters he described discoveries made by research expeditions in Arizona and California and described living conditions, climate etc. Carolus Josephus Kappus von Pichelstein, a nephew of Marcus Antonius, was member of the Academia Operosorum, which was founded in Ljubljana in 1693 after the example of similar academies in Italy. Vladimir Kapus von Pichelstein (1885–1943), a Slovene writer and publisher, was also from the Kapus family.

Linhart attended primary school in his home town and then went to Ljubljana. He studied trade and finance in Vienna. Before finishing his studies, he also spent a short time in the Stična monastery in Lower Carniola. After returning to Ljubljana, he was hired as an archivist by the bishop of Ljubljana. He later also worked as a chief book reviser, school commissioner, ending up as secretary in the Habsburg administration of the district of Carniola.

In 1786, he was appointed school commissioner for the district of Ljubljana. Within three years of his appointment he increased the number of primary schools in the rural areas of the district from 9 to 18. He was also very keen on establishing a central public study library in Ljubljana and it was on his initiatives that the Lyceum Library in Ljubljana, the predecessor of the present National and University Library of Slovenia.

From the early 1780s on, Linhart began frequenting a circle of Slovene enlighteners who met in the Zois Mansion in Ljubljana. There, he met several intellectuals, including Sigmund Zois, Valentin Vodnik, Jernej Kopitar, Jurij Japelj and others, in whose company he developed an interest in Slovene language, culture, and history. He wrote two plays in Slovene and then began a project to write the first comprehensive history of the Slovene Lands but did not finish it. He unexpectedly died in Ljubljana on the night of July 14, 1795, around midnight, from aortic aneurysm. He has a tombstone in the Navje memorial park in Ljubljana, alongside other important personalities of Slovene history, but it is not certain that he has been indeed buried there.

== Work ==
His first literary work, written while still studying, was a book of poems titled Blumen aus Krain (Flowers from Carniola), written in German. His first tragedy Miss Jenny Love (also in German) was published in 1780. Under the influence of Slovene enlighteners, especially Marko Pohlin and Sigmund Zois, he began writing in Slovene. He translated and adapted the comedy of the German dramatist Joseph Richter Die Feldmühle (The Country Mill). His title for it was Županova Micka (Micka, the Mayor's Daughter). It is regarded as the first comedy and theatrical play in Slovene and was premiered on December 28, 1789. He also adapted Beaumarchais's comedy The Marriage of Figaro into a new play Ta veseli dan ali Matiček se ženi (This Merry Day or Matiček's Wedding).

As a historian he wrote a two-volumed work in German Versuch einer Geschichte von Krain und der übrigen südlichen Slaven Oesterreichs (An Essay on the History of Carniola and Other Austrian South Slavs). The first volume was published in 1788 and describes the proto-Slavic era. The second, titled Versuch einer Geschichte von Krain und den übrigen Ländern der südlichen Slaven Oesterreichs (An Essay on the History of Carniola and Other Lands of the Austrian South Slavs) was published in 1791. It deals with the age of migrations, the Slavic settlement in the Eastern Alps and later political development of the Slovene people, starting from Samo realm and Carantania.

Linhart's historical work, strongly influenced by the ideas of the German philosopher Johann Gottfried Herder, had an important influence for the development of the Slovene national consciousness in the early 19th century. In this work, he was the first to define the Slovenes as a separate branch of the Slavic peoples with its common history. In his Essay, he was the first to define the Slovenes as a separate branch of the Slavic people. With it, he also established the linguistic unity of the Slovene ethnic territory and set the foundations of the Slovene ethnography. In his work, he wrote:

"The people that live in the southern part of the Austrian department between the Drava and the Adriatic and belong to the big, distinctive, Slavic human tree, and by their language and origin represent one and the same human branch and are only accidentally – though, from the standpoint of history, not quite accurately – classified into Carniolans and Vinds, deserve indeed to have their own history written. So far we have had it piecemeal in the scattered chronicles of provinces in which these people live, but never in the totality of their interrelated destinies and experiences."

== Views ==
Linhart was an adherent of the Enlightenment worldview. He was a deist for a time, later exhibiting agnostic views, and was critical towards the privileges of the nobility and the Church. Initially, he had a favourable opinion of the reforms of the Emperor Joseph II, but he was critical of his centralist policies as well as of his neglect of the various regional languages in the Habsburg Empire.

Linhart was one of the first supporters of Austroslavism, a political program aiming to achieve a cultural and political emancipation of Slavic peoples within the Austrian Empire.
