= Exhibition and Convention Centre (Ljubljana) =

Venue in Slovenia

Coordinates: 46°3′40.81″N 14°30′28.97″E

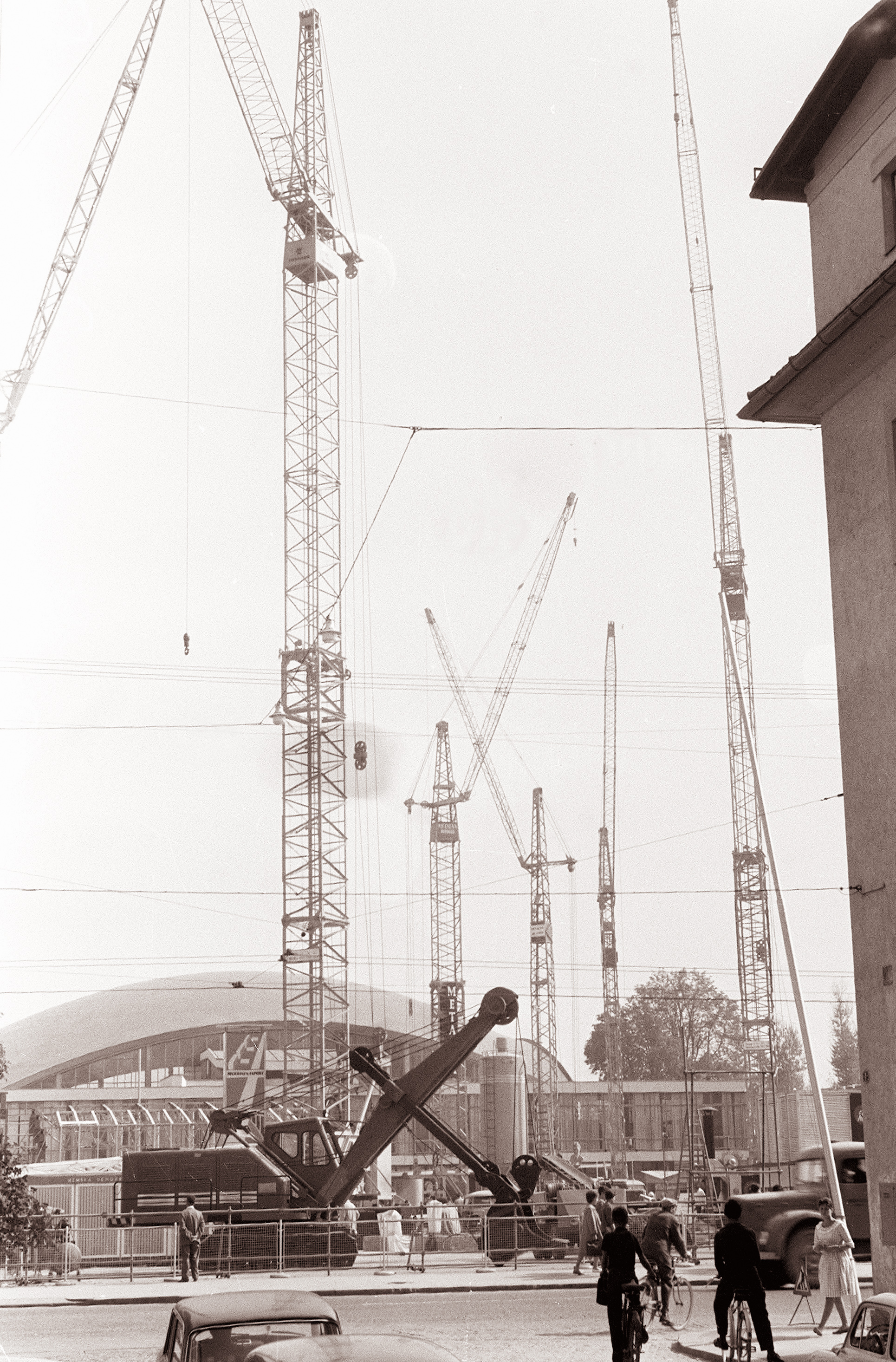
International Construction Fair at the Exhibition and Convention Centre in 1961

The Exhibition and Convention Centre (Slovene: Gospodarsko razstavišče) in Ljubljana is a venue for organising domestic and international fairs as well as other events. The building complex stands in the Bežigrad District, between Vienna Street (Dunajska cesta, Vilhar Street (Vilharjeva cesta), and Robba Street (Robbova ulica), north of the Ljubljana railway station. It is operated by the Ljubljana Exhibition and Convention Centre company. The basic mission of the company is the organization of various events where the exhibitors and visitors meet and cooperate creatively.

== History and construction phase ==
The center was designed by architects Ilija Arnautović, Milan Mihelič, Branko Simčič, and Marko Šlajmer in the 1950s and the 1960s,. In 1954 the Communist Party of Yugoslavia decided that its 1955 7th Congress would take place in the new exhibition centre, and the construction was sped up accordingly. To make room for the new exhibition center, many of the old structures were destroyed. It was built on top of the former Saint Christopher's Cemetery and two churches were removed for the construction: the old Saint Christopher's Church (a Baroque structure) and Saints Cyril and Methodius Church (designed by Jože Plečnik).

In 2001 the halls Steklena Hall - C and Jurček - E were renovated, the Kupola - A hall was renovated in 2002, and renovation was finally finished in 2005 with the last halls Marmorna Hall - B and Povodni mož - B2.

== Fairs ==
The centre is a general place for exhibitions and meetings. In 2017 the centre for instance hosts annual general meeting for Eurocities. In the past the centre was probably most known for its hosting of auto-motor show. The centre is also known for hosting music and culture events.

For reference in 2010 the centre for instance has host following fairs:

- 21–24 January 2010 - Boat fair
- 21–24 January 2010 - Tourism and leisure
- 29–30 January 2010 - Informativa
- 8–11 February 2010 - Gast expo & Icecream fair
- 8–11 February 2010 - Wine fair
- 2–7 March 2010 - Home fair
- 17–19 March 2010 - Promarket
- 26–28 March 2010 - Collecta
- 3–5 September 2010 - Auto motor show Ljubljana
- 9–12 September 2010 - Children's fair
- 18–19 September 2010 - Oldtimer cars fair Codelli
- 7–10 October 2010 - Nature and wellness fair
- 19–21 October 2010 - Students fair
- 9–14 November 2010 - Furniture fair
- 25–28 November 2010 - Camping and caravaning fair
- 25–28 November 2010 - Ski fair Snowflake
- 1–2 December 2010 - Career fair
