= Ljubljana Mosque =

Mosque in Bežigrad, Ljubljana, Slovenia

- Džamija v Ljubljani
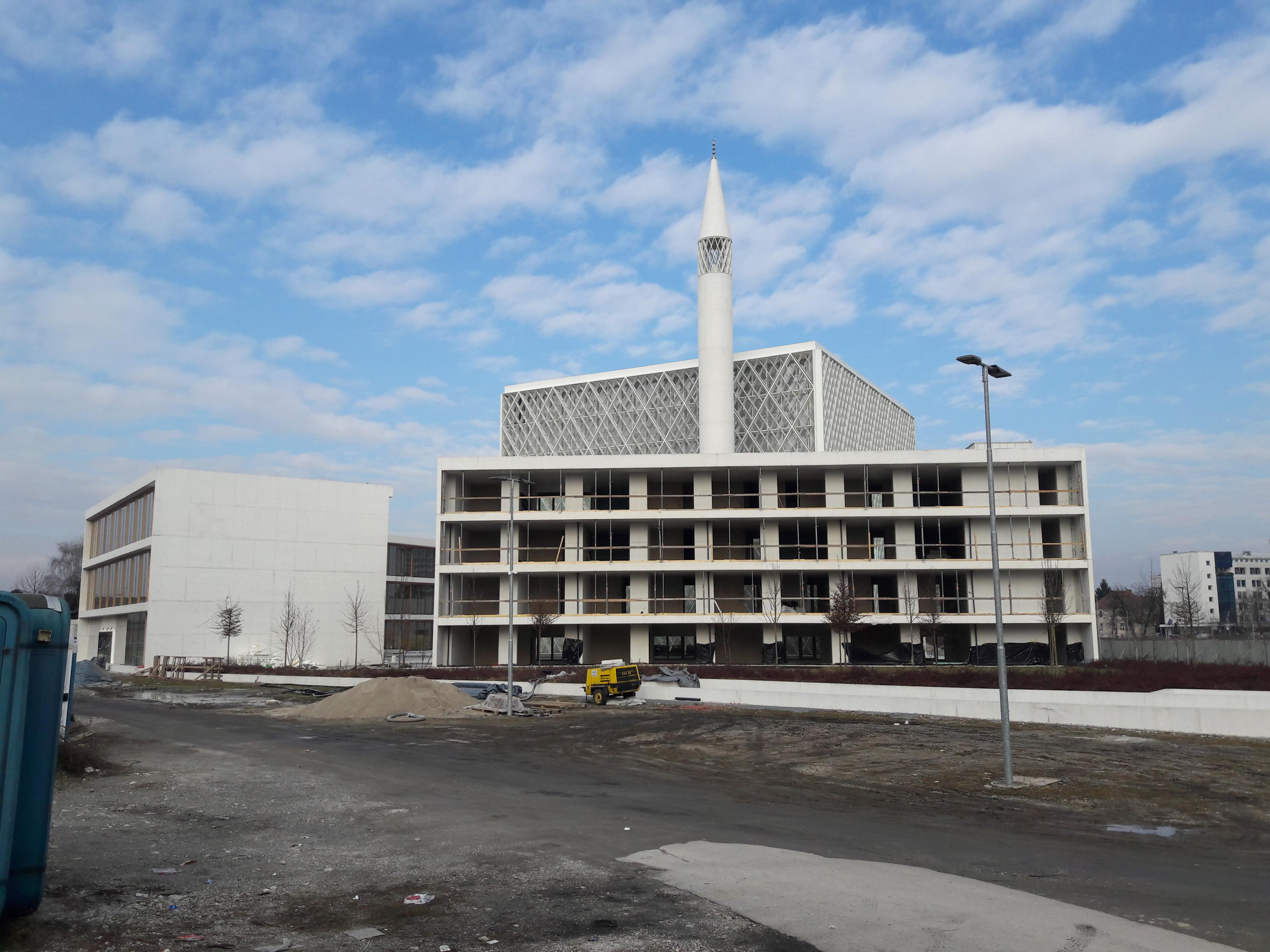

- Slovenia

Religion
- Affiliation: Islam
- Branch/tradition: Sunni

Location
- Location: Bežigrad, Ljubljana, Slovenia
- Coordinates: 46°3′36.25″N 14°30′10.39″E

Architecture
- Type: mosque, cultural center
- Funded by: Qatar
- Established: February 2020
- Groundbreaking: 2013
- Construction cost: EUR34 million

The Islamic Religio-Cultural Center (Slovene: Islamski versko-kulturni center), colloquially known as the Ljubljana mosque (Džamija v Ljubljani or Ljubljanska mošeja) is an Islamic mosque and cultural-center complex in the Bežigrad district of Ljubljana, the capital of Slovenia. It is the culmination of a decades-long effort by the Islamic Community of Slovenia. A library, a classroom, an ablution fountain and the Imam's offices and quarters are included in the complex.

== History ==
Many Muslims were among the wave of internal migrants from other Yugoslav republics who gravitated to Slovenia during the 1960s and 1970s. A permit for the construction of a mosque was first requested in 1969, but was not granted; the effort was revived during the 1990s. The 1990s proposal produced a nationalist backlash, with considerable public opposition to the mosque. The City Council made an attempt to call a municipal referendum to prohibit the construction of the mosque in late 2003. Opposed by Ljubljana mayor Danica Simšič as a "constitutionally-forbidden encroachment on the constitutionally-guaranteed rights of a religious minority", the referendum was rejected by the Constitutional Court in July 2004. In December 2008, city councilor Mihael Jarc began gathering signatures for a second referendum, this time to delete the mosque's proposed 40 m minaret, over the opposition of mayor Zoran Janković. This time the Constitutional Court approved the signature-gathering process; the mayor however vowed to continue to fight it.

The reaction among the-then prominent national political parties was mixed; LDS and Zares voiced support for the construction of the mosque; SD, DESUS and SDS remained neutral on the matter, while SNS expressed opposition.

A ceremony was held at the future site of the complex in September 2013 to lay the foundation stone. Construction is expected to begin in November and last about three years.

In February 2020, the mosque was completed and opened to the public.

=== Site and design ===
In 2004, a 2800 m^{2} site on Cesta dveh cesarjev Road was planned, bought by the municipality from the Lazarite order for 350,000 euros to be made available for purchase by the Islamic Community of Slovenia. By late 2008, the location had changed to a plot between Kurilniška and Parmova streets. The design of the center has seen several changes, with the maximum size and height of the structure the subject of debate. A final decision was reached in late 2008. The construction cost is projected to total €12 million. A large donation from Qatar is expected to pay for about 70% of this.

The extension of Livarska Street leading to the complex has been renamed "Džamijska ulica," after the Slovene word for "mosque," a cognate of the Arabic jamaat ("congregation").

== See also ==
- Islam in Slovenia
