= Navje Memorial Park =

Memorial park in Slovenia

Coordinates: 46°3′37.98″N 14°30′42.67″E

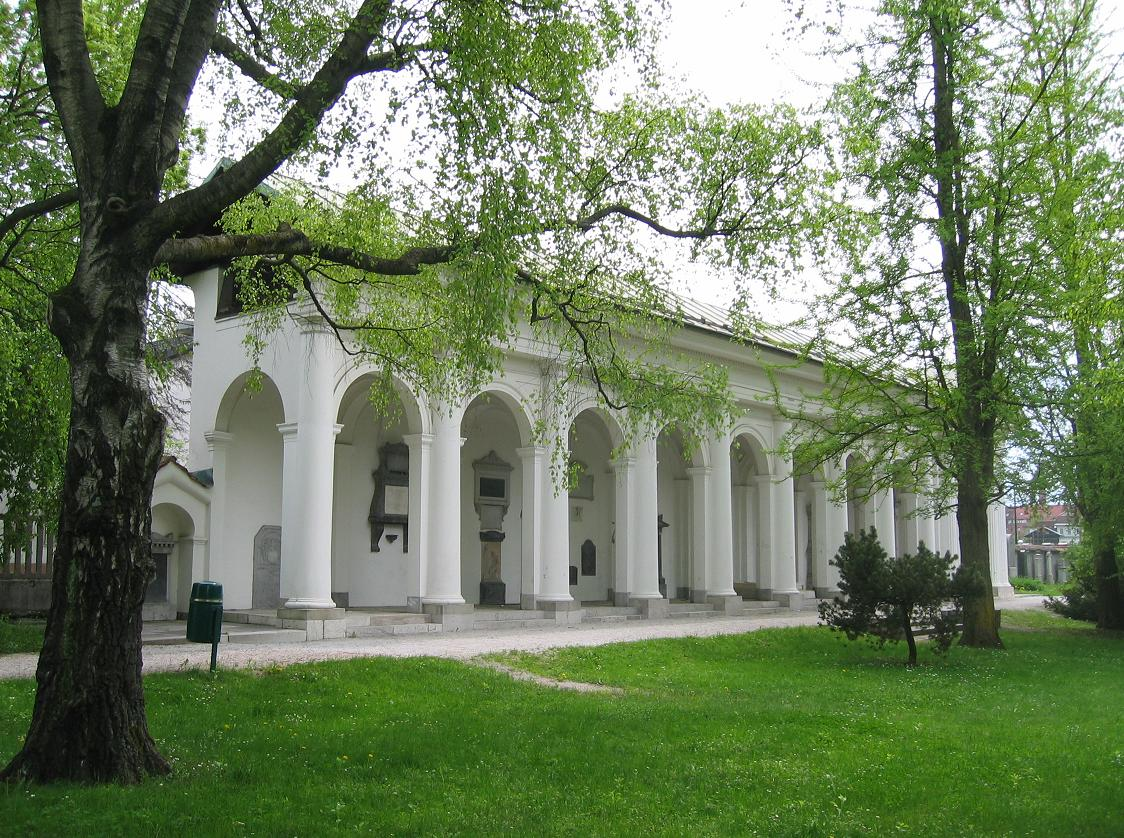
The Neoclassical arcade porch at Navje Memorial Park

Navje Memorial Park (Slovene: Spominski park Navje), the redesigned part of the former St. Christopher's Cemetery (pokopališče pri sv. Krištofu), is a memorial park in Ljubljana, the capital of Slovenia. It is located in the Bežigrad district, just behind the Ljubljana railway station.

== History ==
=== St. Christopher's Cemetery ===
St. Christopher's Cemetery was blessed in May 1779 by Johann Karl von Herberstein, the Bishop of Ljubljana, and was located in the area of today's Exhibition and Convention Centre. Between the late 18th century and the early 20th century, it was the central town cemetery. In 1906, a new cemetery was established next to Holy Cross Church and most new burials gradually took place there. After 1926, burials no longer took place at St. Christopher's Cemetery, and it was destroyed in 1955 together with the two churches associated with it in order to create a fairground for the 7th Congress of the Communist Party of Yugoslavia. The various remains that were gathered from the site were transferred to a nearby common grave at what was intended to be the Baraga Seminary, and only Jernej Kopitar and Ivan Tušek were actually reburied in Navje.

=== Design ===
In the 1930s, a small portion of the old cemetery, including the arcade porch that was built around 1865, was transformed in a "pantheon" of famous Slovenes. The memorial park was designed by the architects Jože Plečnik and Ivo Spinčič in collaboration with the gardener Anton Lah. Already in 1932, Plečnik had proposed building a monumental church on the same site, which would include a crypt with tombs of prominent Slovenes. The project, planned together with his student Edvard Ravnikar, was however rejected, and so Plečnik proposed the creation of Navje Memorial Park.

=== Later history ===
Between 1936 and 1940 several gravestones and tombstones of notable personalities were moved into the park, but because of the Axis invasion of Yugoslavia in April 1941 the project was never completed. Many of the gravestones planned to be moved into Navje Memorial Park, such as those of Prešeren, Trubar, Maister, and Rusjan, were not brought in, and many graves of unimportant individuals, planned to be moved to Žale, have remained in the park. Plečnik's plans to enlarge the park were never carried out. After World War II, the park was largely neglected and renovation took place only in the 1990s.

== Prominent gravestones ==
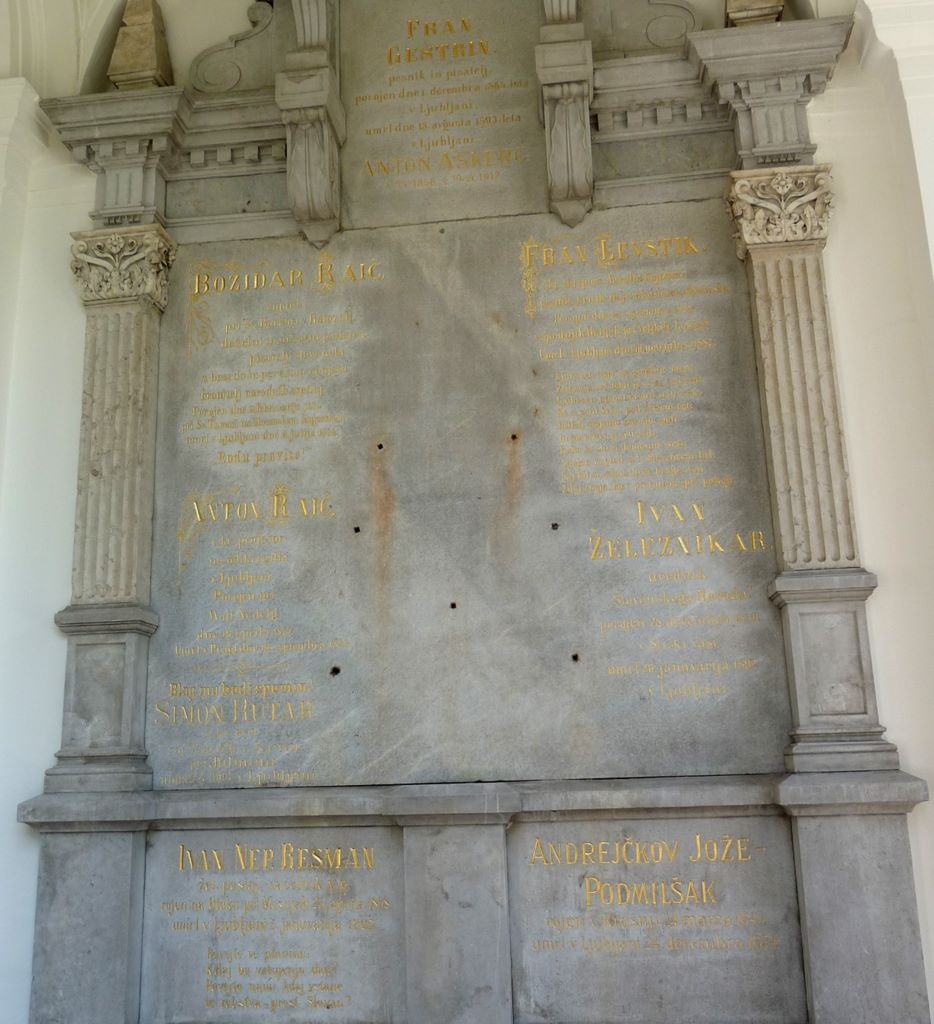
The writers' tomb at Navje Memorial Park is the tomb of eight notable Slovene poets and writers: Anton Aškerc, Fran Gestrin, Fran Levstik, Josip Podmilšak (Andrejčkov Jože), Anton Raič, Božidar Raič, Ivan Resman, Simon Rutar, Josip Stritar, and Ivan Železnikar.

Notable people's gravestones displayed at Navje Memorial Park include:

- Anton Aškerc (1856–1912), poet
- Josef Blasnik (1800–1872), editor
- Janez Bleiweis (1808–1881), politician, known as "The Father of the Nation"
- Matija Čop (1797–1835), philologist and the closest friend and collaborator of the poet France Prešeren
- Karl Deschmann (1821–1889), historian and politician
- Mihael Dežman (1783–1833), merchant
- Jurij Flajšman (1818–1874), composer
- Ivan Grohar (1867–1911), painter
- Johann Nepomuk Hradeczky (1775–1846), Mayor of Ljubljana (1820–1846)
- Luka Jeran (1818–1898), Roman Catholic priest and missionary, founder of the Salesians of Don Bosco in the Slovenia
- Josip Jurčič (1844–1881), novelist and editor
- Jernej Kopitar (1780–1844), philologist
- Anton Korošec (1872–1940), politician
- Emil Korytko (1813–1839), Polish ethnologist and political activist
- Fran Levstik (1831–1887), writer and political activist
- Anton Tomaž Linhart (1756–1795), playwright and historian
- Kašpar Mašek (1794–1873), Slovene-Czech composer
- Fran Maselj (pen name: Podlimbarski, 1851–1917), author and officer of the Austro-Hungarian Army
- Anton Nedvěd (1829–1896), Slovene-Czech composer
- Josef Ressel (1793–1857), Bohemian engineer and inventor of the naval propeller
- Simon Rutar (1851–1903), historian
- Edo Šlajmer (1864–1935), physician, founder of modern surgery in Slovenia
- Josip Stritar (1836–1923), poet and literary critic
- Ivan Tušek (1835–1877), natural scientist and writer
- Valentin Vodnik (1758–1819), poet and editor
