= Emil Korytko =

Polish political activist (1813–1839)

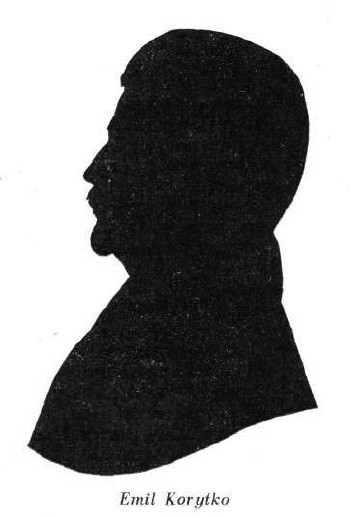
Emil Korytko's silhouette from the 19th century

Emil Antoni Korytko (7 September 1813 – 31 January 1839) was a Polish political activist in the period of the Great Emigration, who was exiled to Ljubljana, Carniola (now Slovenia) and became an important ethnographer, philologist and translator there. His legacy are collections of Slovene folk songs and vivid descriptions of Carniolan folk customs. He significantly contributed to the mutual dialogue between Polish and Slovene authors and readers.

== Early life and study ==
Korytko was born on 7 September 1813 in Zhezhava (now Zelenyi Hai, Zalishchyky Raion) or Lviv in Austrian Galicia (now in the Ternopil Oblast in Ukraine). From 1832, he studied philosophy and philology at the University of Lwow. He participated in the November Uprising. In 1834, he was arrested by the Austrian authorities in Lviv on accusations of having participated in underground subversive activities, and in 1836 sent into confinement to Ljubljana, Duchy of Carniola (now in Slovenia), together with Bogusław Horodyński, where they arrived in late January 1837.

== Exile into Ljubljana ==
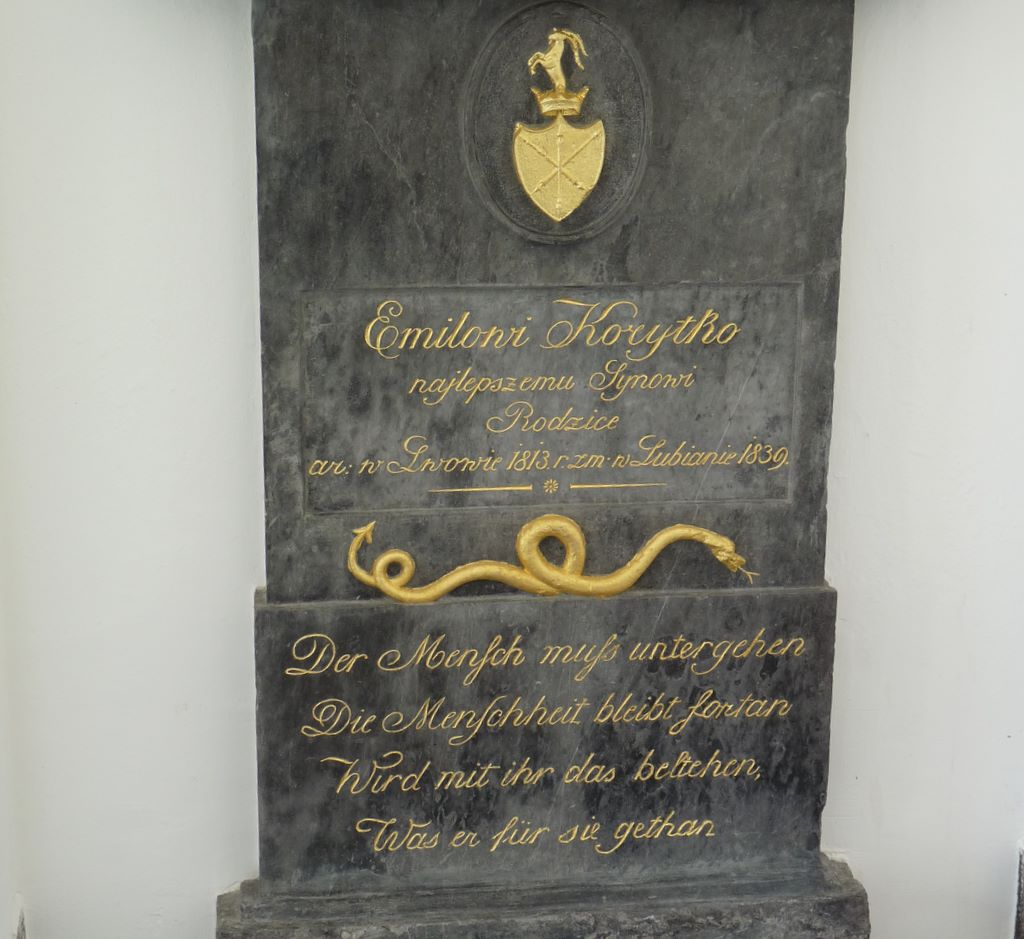
The gravestone of Emil Korytko at Navje, with the German verses written by France Prešeren

In Ljubljana, Korytko became a close collaborator of the Slovene national Romantic circle. He became a personal friend of the Slovene poet France Prešeren, and helped him translate several poems by Adam Mickiewicz into German. He also translated some of Prešeren's poems into German. He studied Slovene folk songs from Carniola, which he published in five volumes, and Carniolan folk customs. He prompted the painter Franz Kurz zum Turn und Goldenstein to paint 70 portraits of people in various folk costumes.

Korytko died at the age of 25 in Ljubljana due to typhus, and was buried at Navje (then St. Christopher's Cemetery) in the Bežigrad District. His funeral was one of the first public manifestations of Slovene patriotism. Among the young Slovene patriots chosen to carry Korytko's coffin was Karel Dežman.

== Commemoration ==
In November 2013, the celebration of 200th anniversary of Korytko's birth was held in Ljubljana, organised by the Polish Embassy and the University of Ljubljana. An exhibition has been held in the National and University Library of Slovenia since 7 November, and a commemorative postage stamp was issued. In 2019 an exhibition devoted to Korytko was held in the Slovenian Parliament, and a special Slovenian–Polish volume was published. In 2023, the Post of Slovenia issued a stamp commemorating the 210th anniversary of Korytko's birth.
