= Marko Pohlin =

Slovene philologist and author (1735–1801)

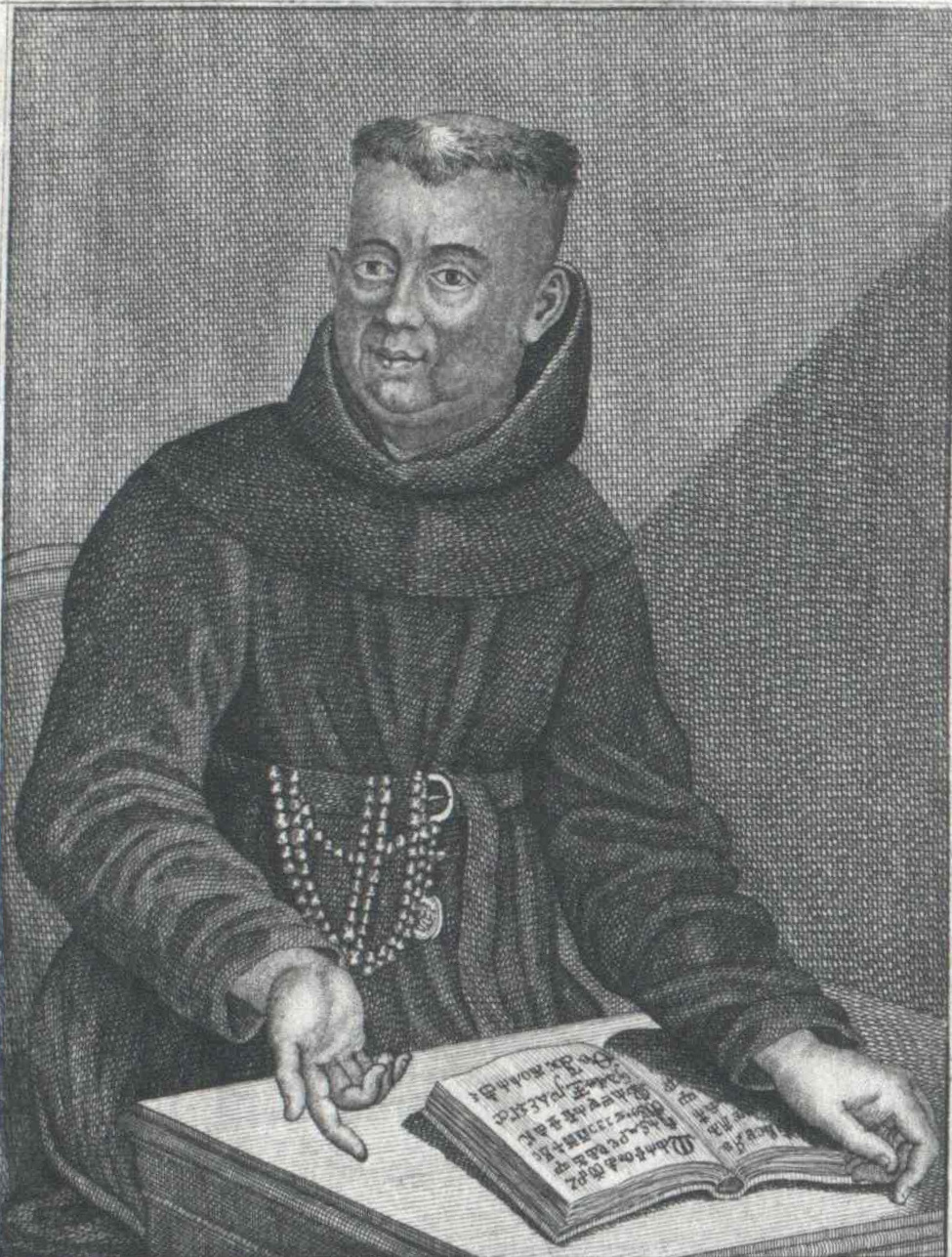
Marko Pohlin

Marko Pohlin born Anton Pohlin (13 April 1735 – 4 February 1801), was a Slovene philologist and author. He is generally considered the first exponent of the Age of Enlightenment in the Slovene Lands.

He was baptized Antonius Puhlin in Ljubljana, in what was then the Duchy of Carniola in the Habsburg monarchy, born the son of a tavern owner. He studied in Jesuit colleges in Novo Mesto and Ljubljana, and joined the Augustinian order.

He is best known for his book Kraynska grammatika (Carniolan Grammar), a grammar of Slovene written in German. In it, Pohlin attempted to modernize Adam Bohorič's sixteenth-century grammar. The work is especially important for its preface, in which Pohlin praised Slovene and rejected those that regarded it as rough and unworthy of being used in literature. Pohlin also composed a Slovene–German–Latin dictionary entitled Tu malu besedishe treh jesikov (Small Trilingual Dictionary) or Dictionarium slavicum carniolicum (Slavic-Carniolan Dictionary). In 1779, he published the first issue of Pisanice (Writings), an almanac of popular songs from Carniola and Carinthia.

Pohlin was also the author of the book Kraynske kroneke (The Carniolan Chronicles, 1770), which is considered the first work of historiography written in Slovene. In his monograph, republished and enlarged in 1788, Pohlin took as a source the Dalmatian humanist historian Mauro Orbini, who saw the Slavs as the most ancient people in Europe. Pohlin's historiographic work is considered of little worth but it was important in boosting the ethnic consciousness of his contemporary countymen.

He also wrote the first Slovenian bibliography, titled Bibliotheca Carnioliae or Carniolan Library, which was published posthumously in 1803. Despite the book's regional title, Pohlin also included authors from other Slovene-inhabited regions. He included all books by local authors, regardless of the language they were written in, and also included several works that had remained in manuscript. He also used the occasion to warn his readers of the dangers of bibliomania, several years before the word became popularized in Great Britain by John Ferriar and Thomas Dibdin in 1809.

Although Pohlin's linguistic innovations were later rejected by his successors, his Kraynska grammatika marked the beginning of the revival of Slovene language and culture, which was later continued in Zois' circle.

He died in the monastery of Mariabrunn near Vienna.
