= Josef Ressel =

Czech-German inventor and forester

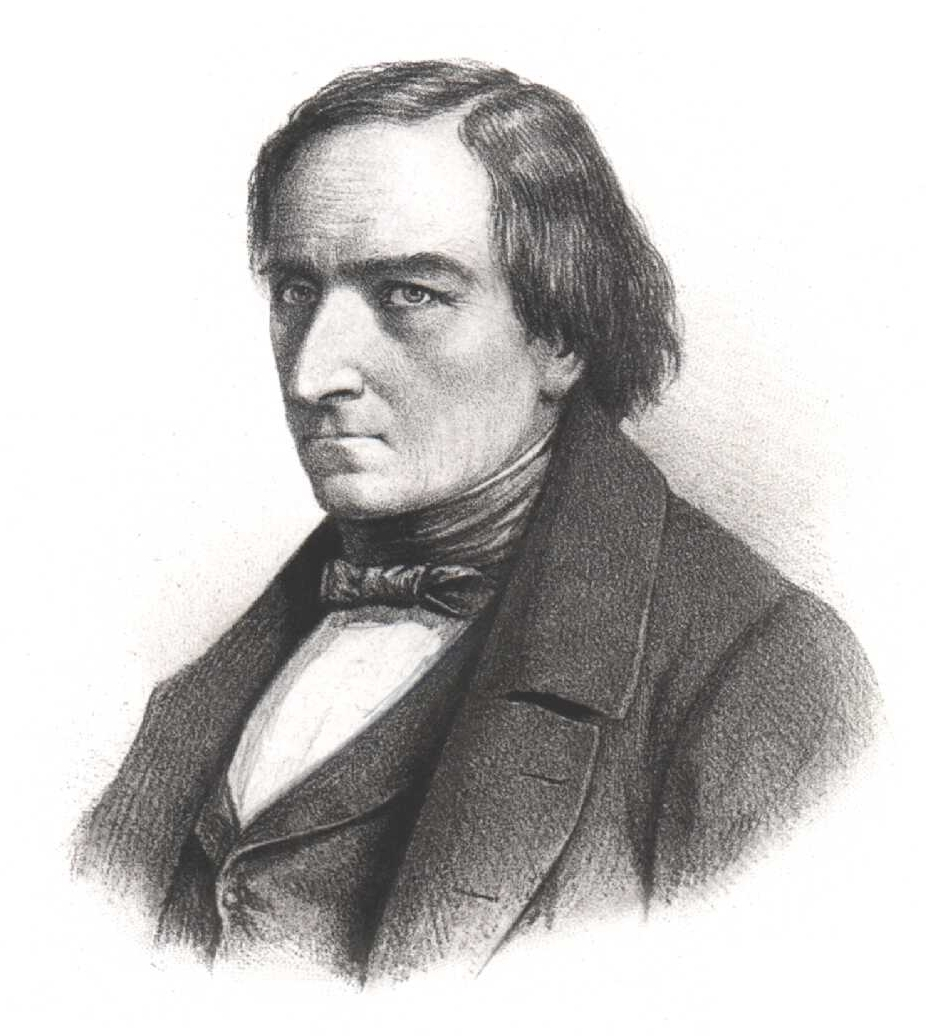
- Born: June 29, 1793; Chrudim, Bohemia, Habsburg monarchy
- Died: October 9, 1857 (aged 64); Ljubljana, Carniola, Austrian Empire
- Known for: marine propeller

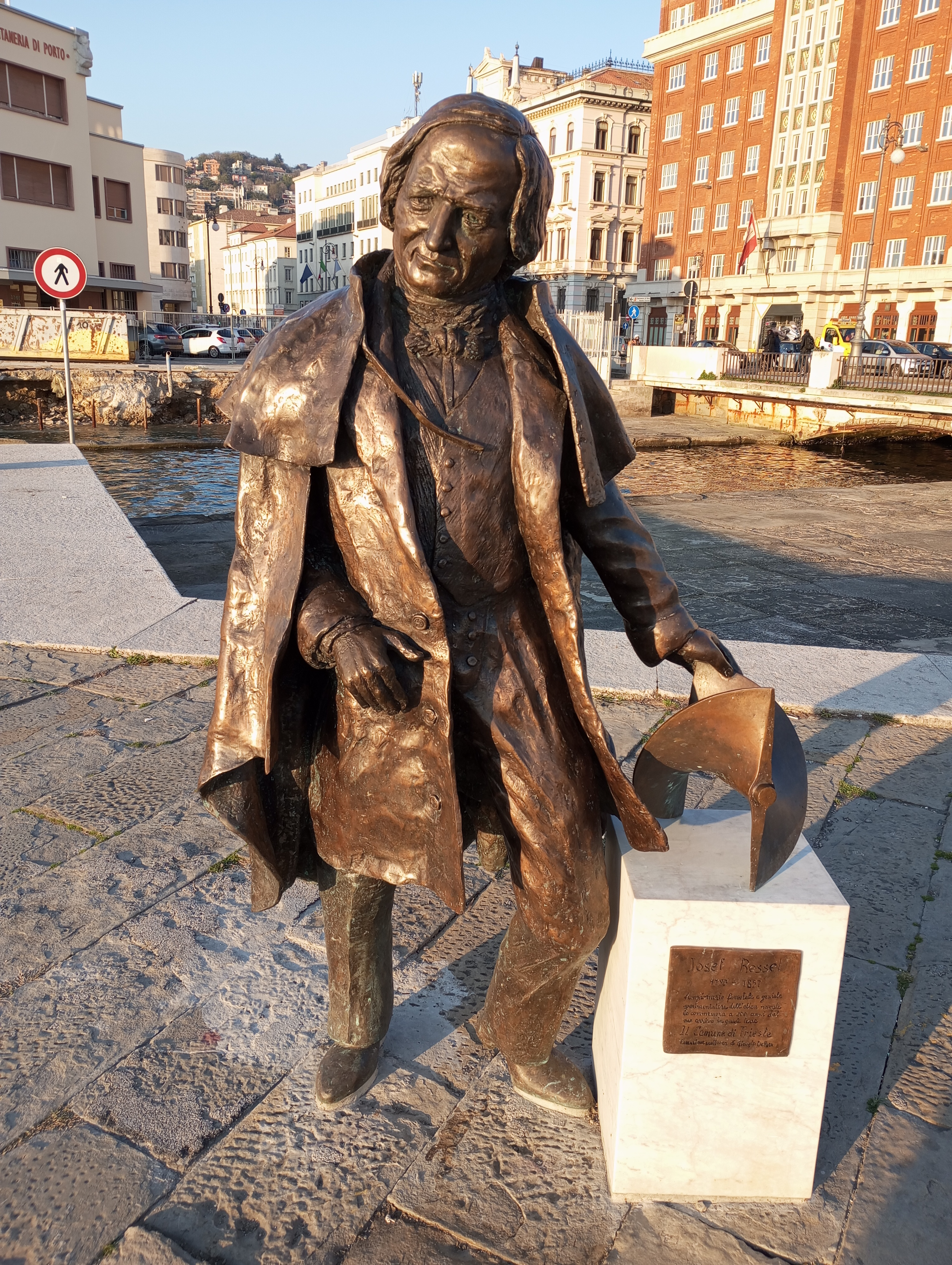
Statue of Josef Ressel in the Port of Trieste

Josef Ludwig Franz Ressel (Czech: Josef Ludvík František Ressel; June 29, 1793 – October 9, 1857) was a Czech-German forester and inventor who designed one of the first working ship's propellers.

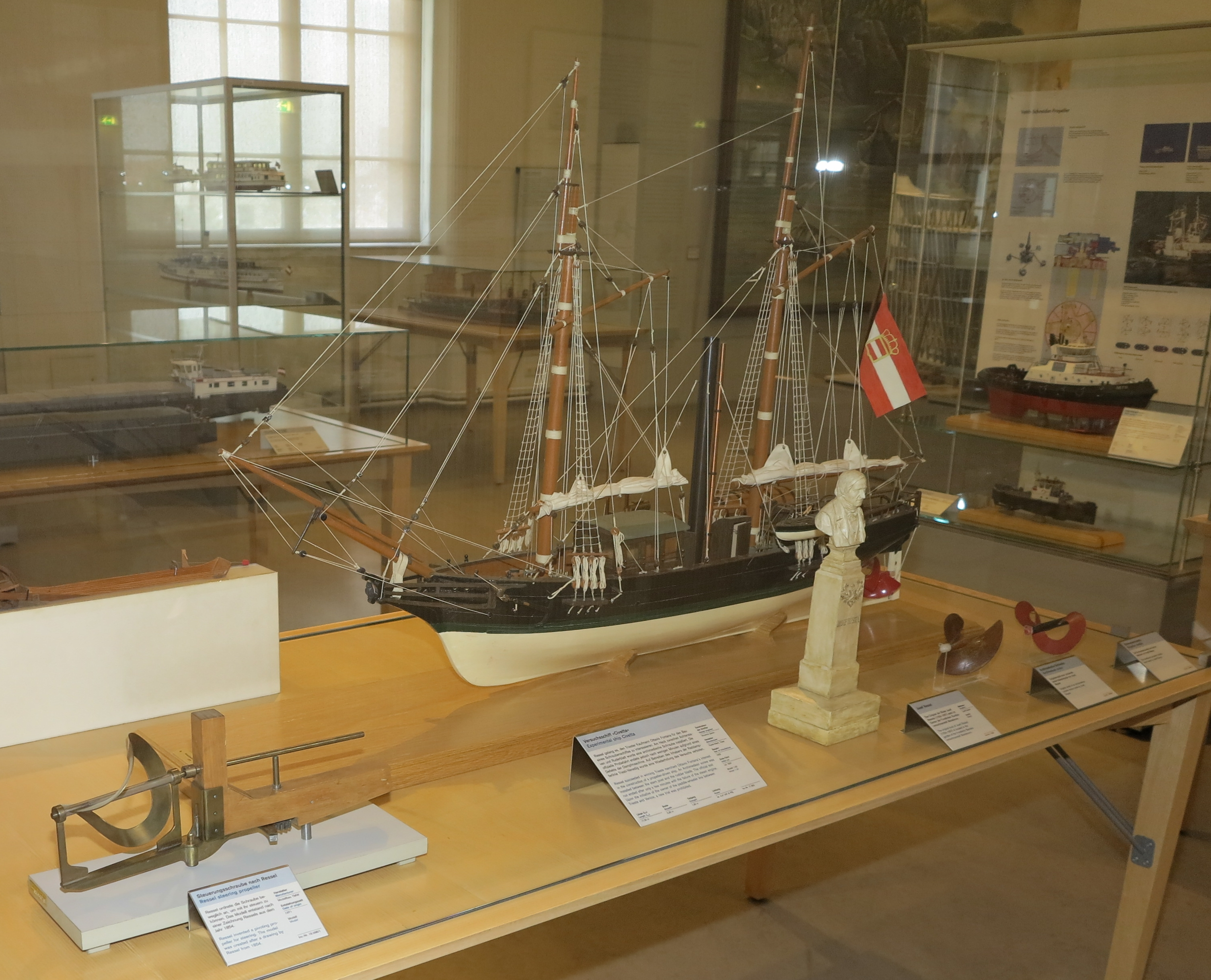
Josef Ressel, Vienna Technical Museum

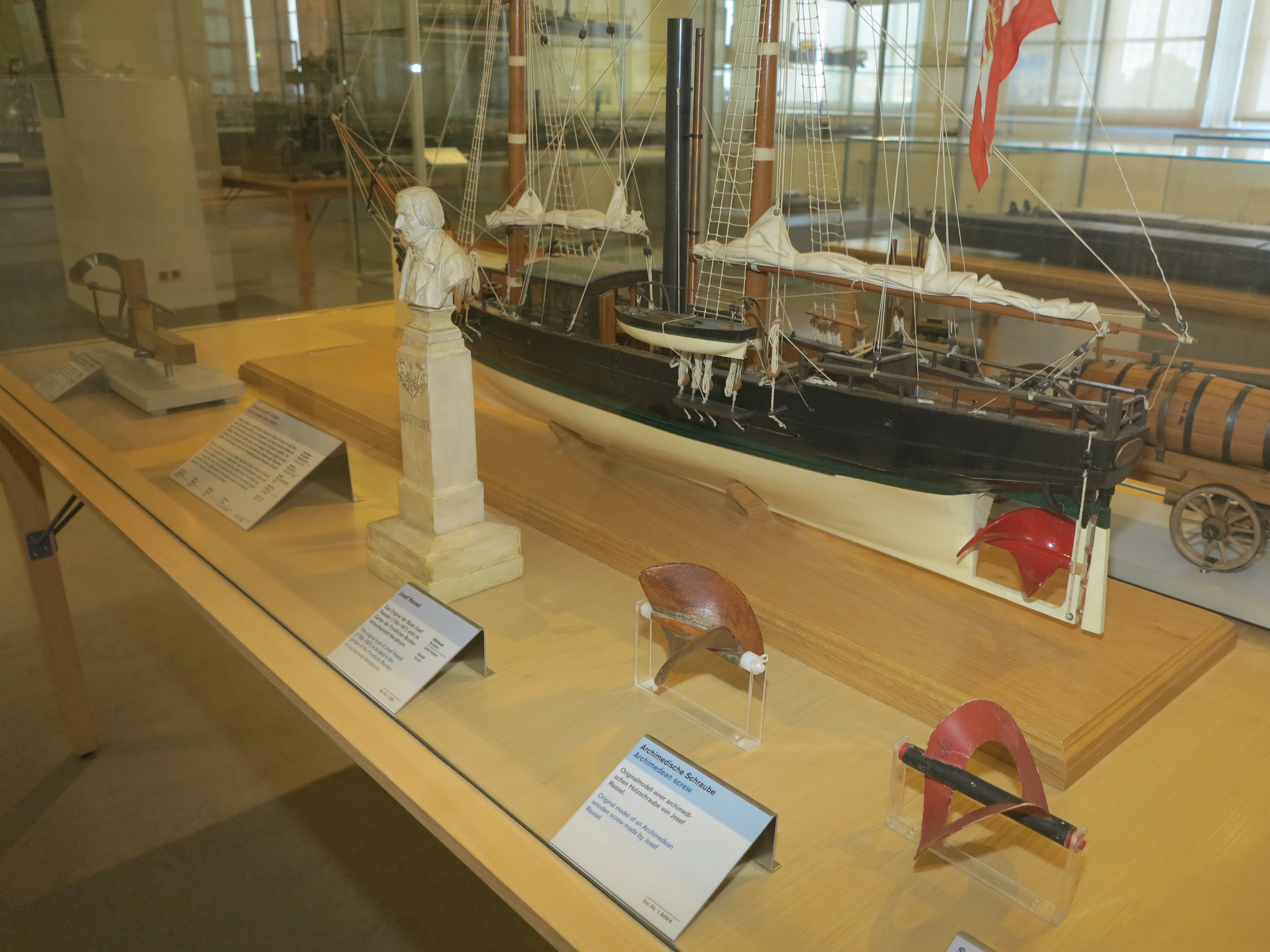
The first working ship propeller, Vienna Technical Museum

== Life ==
Ressel was born in Chrudim, Bohemia, Holy Roman Empire (now the Czech Republic). His father Anton Hermann Ressel was a German speaker and his mother Marie Anna Konvičková was a native Czech, but because she did not know much German, Czech was spoken in their family. He studied at the artillery school in České Budějovice, where he received an education in the fields of mathematics, geometry, and technical drawing. He then studied at the University of Vienna, where he attended lectures on forestry, technology, natural sciences and chemistry. However, he was forced to leave due to a lack of funds to continue his studies. After he graduating from the Mariabrunn Forestry Academy, he became a forester.

He worked for the Austrian government as a forester in the more southern parts of the monarchy, including in Motovun, Istria. His work was to secure a supply of quality wood for the Navy. He worked in Landstrass (Kostanjevica on the Krka river in Carniola), where he tested his ship propellers for the first time. In 1821 he was transferred to Trieste, the biggest port of the Austrian Empire, where his tests were successful. He was awarded a propeller patent in 1827. He modified a steam-powered boat Civetta by 1829 and test-navigated it in the Trieste harbor at six knots before the steam conduits exploded. Because of this misfortune, the police banned further testing. The explosion was not caused by the propeller being tested, as many believed at the time.

As early as 1804, the American John Fitch is credited with a screw propeller, which was unsuccessful. In 1836, the Englishman Francis Pettit Smith tested a screw propeller similar to Ressel's. The first transatlantic journey of a ship powered by a screw-propeller was by the SS Great Britain in 1845. Propeller design stabilized in the 1880s.

Besides having been called "the inventor of the propeller," he was also called the inventor of the steamship and a monument to him in a park in Vienna commemorates him as "the one and only inventor of the screw propeller and steam shipping." He was also commemorated on Austria's 500 Schilling banknote in the mid-1960s (catalog designation P139), which shows him on the front and the ship Civetta on the back.

Among Ressel's other inventions are pneumatic post and ball and cylinder bearings. He was granted numerous patents during his life.

Ressel also played an important role in the reforestation of the Karst Plateau near Trieste. A bronze statue of him was placed along the waterfront of Trieste on March 30, 2022.

He died in Laibach (now Ljubljana, Slovenia) and was buried there in St. Christopher's Cemetery in the Bežigrad district. His gravestone is displayed today in Navje Memorial Park.
