= Jernej Kopitar =

Slovene philologist

- Born: 21 August 1780; Repnje, Habsburg monarchy
- Died: 11 August 1844 (aged 63); Vienna, Austrian Empire
- Scientific career
- Fields: Linguistics; Slavic studies

Jernej Kopitar, also known as Bartholomeus Kopitar (21 August 1780 – 11 August 1844), was a Slovene linguist and philologist working in Vienna. He also worked as the Imperial censor for Slovene literature in Vienna. He is perhaps best known for his role in the Serbian language reform started by Vuk Stefanović Karadžić, where he played a vital role in supporting the reform by using his reputation and influence as a Slavic philologist.

== Early life ==
Kopitar was born in the small Carniolan village of Repnje near Vodice, in what was then the Habsburg monarchy and is now in Slovenia. After graduating from the lyceum in Ljubljana, he became a private teacher in the house of baron Sigmund Zois, a renowned entrepreneur, scientist and patron of arts. Kopitar later became Zois' personal secretary and librarian. During this period, he became acquainted with the circle of Enlightenment intellectuals that gathered in Zois' mansion, such as the playwright and historian Anton Tomaž Linhart, the poet and editor Valentin Vodnik, and philologist Jurij Japelj.

== Career as a censor and linguist ==
In 1808, he moved to Vienna, where he studied law. At the same time, he developed an interest in the comparative analysis of the Slavic languages, to which he would devote all his later life. He became employed as a librarian and later an administrator at the Vienna Court Library. He later become the chief censor for books written in Slavic languages and Modern Greek.

Among European linguists, he was considered a valued scientist and thinker. Particularly important is his correspondence with the Bohemian philologist Josef Dobrovský, his spiritual father, and later with the Serbian philologist Vuk Karadžić. In 1808, he wrote in German and published the first scientific Slovene grammar, titled Grammatik der Slavischen Sprache in Krain, Kärnten und Steyermark (Grammar of the Slavic language in Carniola, Carinthia, and Styria). In his work Glagolita Clozianus (1836), he published the first critically revised, translated, and annotated version of the Freising Manuscripts, the oldest known work in Slovene and the first work in any Slavic language written in the Latin alphabet. In the same work, he advanced the Pannonian Theory of the origin of Common Slavic, which is a theory that is no longer accepted by other scientists.

Under the influence of the efforts of a group of contemporary Carinthian Slovene philologists, especially Urban Jarnik and Matija Ahacel, Kopitar sought to educate a new generation of linguists who would develop grammars and textbooks, advocate orthographic reform, and collect folk literature. During these efforts, he supported a new chair in Slovene at the Ljubljana Lyceum in 1817.

== Language reforms ==
In the early 1830s, Kopitar became involved in the Slovene Alphabet War (Slovene: Abecedna vojna, or Črkarska pravda), a debate over orthographic reform. He supported radical reforms of the old Bohorič alphabet, advanced first by Peter Dajnko and then by Franc Serafin Metelko. Kopitar's main opponent in the conflict was the philologist Matija Čop. Čop convinced the renowned Czech scholar František Čelakovský to publish a devastating critique on the proposed alphabet reforms, which undermined Kopitar's authority. The issue was resolved with the compromise adoption of Gaj's Latin alphabet. Čop and Kopitar also disagreed on the issue of whether the Slovenes should develop their own national culture. Kopitar favored gradual evolution towards a common literary language for all South Slavic peoples, with Slovene dialects remaining the colloquial language of the peasantry. Čop, on the other hand, insisted on the creation of a high culture in Slovene that would follow contemporary literary trends. One of the main supporters of Čop's project, the poet France Prešeren, sharply criticized Kopitar's views, which led to frequent confrontations between the two.

Politically, Kopitar was a supporter of Austroslavism, a doctrine aimed at the unity of Slavic peoples within the Austrian Empire. He was also a staunch conservative, and supporter of the Metternich regime, with a paternalistic approach to the peasant culture. On the other side, Čop and Prešeren emphasized on the cultivation of Slovene as the means for the emergence of a lay Slovene intelligentsia that would foster and develop a specific Slovene identity within the framework of Slavic solidarity. After the Alphabet War in the 1830s, Kopitar's political and cultural influence in his native Slovene Lands diminished significantly. At the same time, however, he gained influence among other South Slavic intelligentsia, especially the Serbian one. He influenced Vuk Stefanović Karadžić in forming a new standard for the Serbian literary language based on common use.

== Death and heritage ==
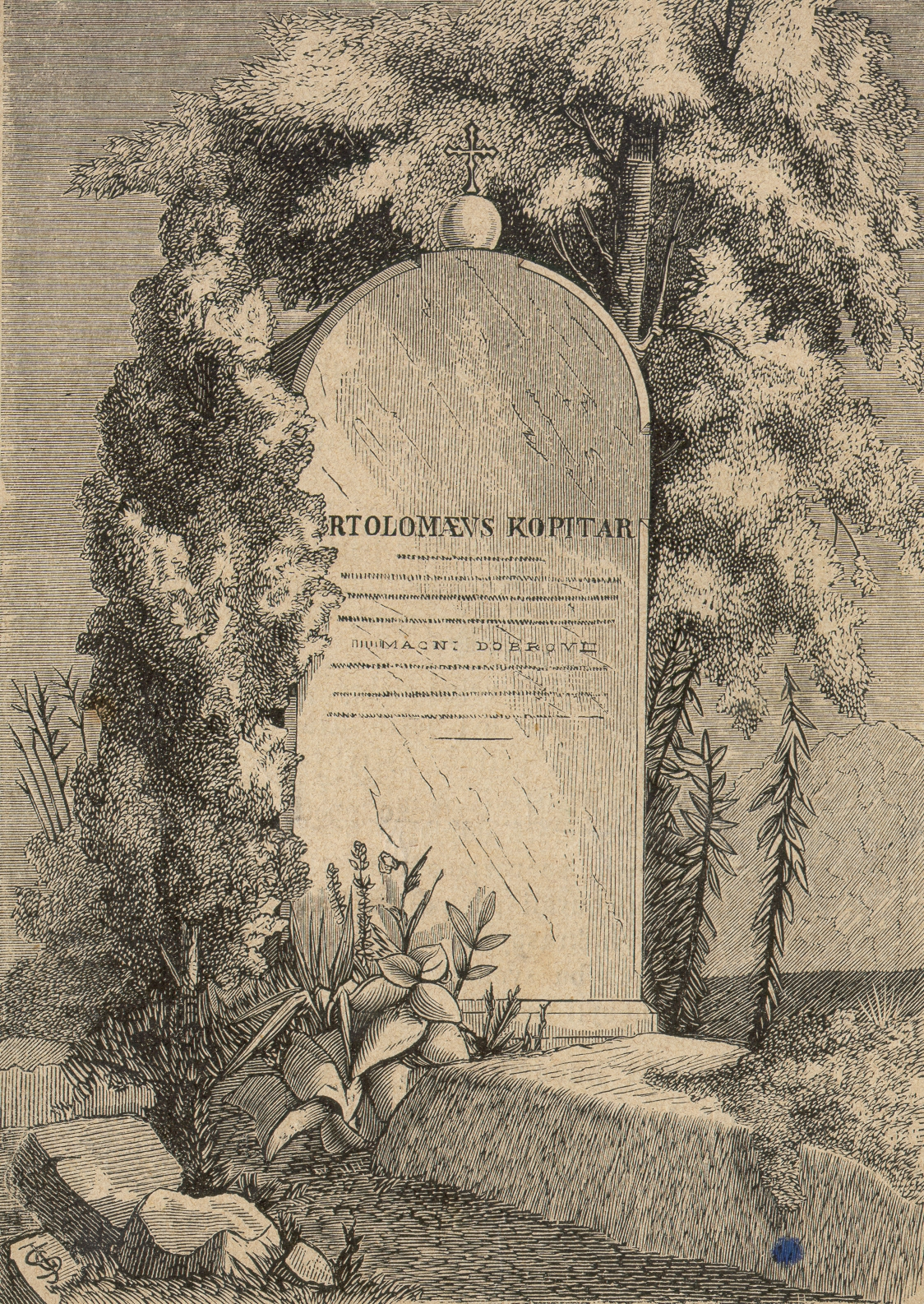
Gravestone of Jernej Kopitar in Vienna, later moved to Navje Memorial Park in Ljubljana.

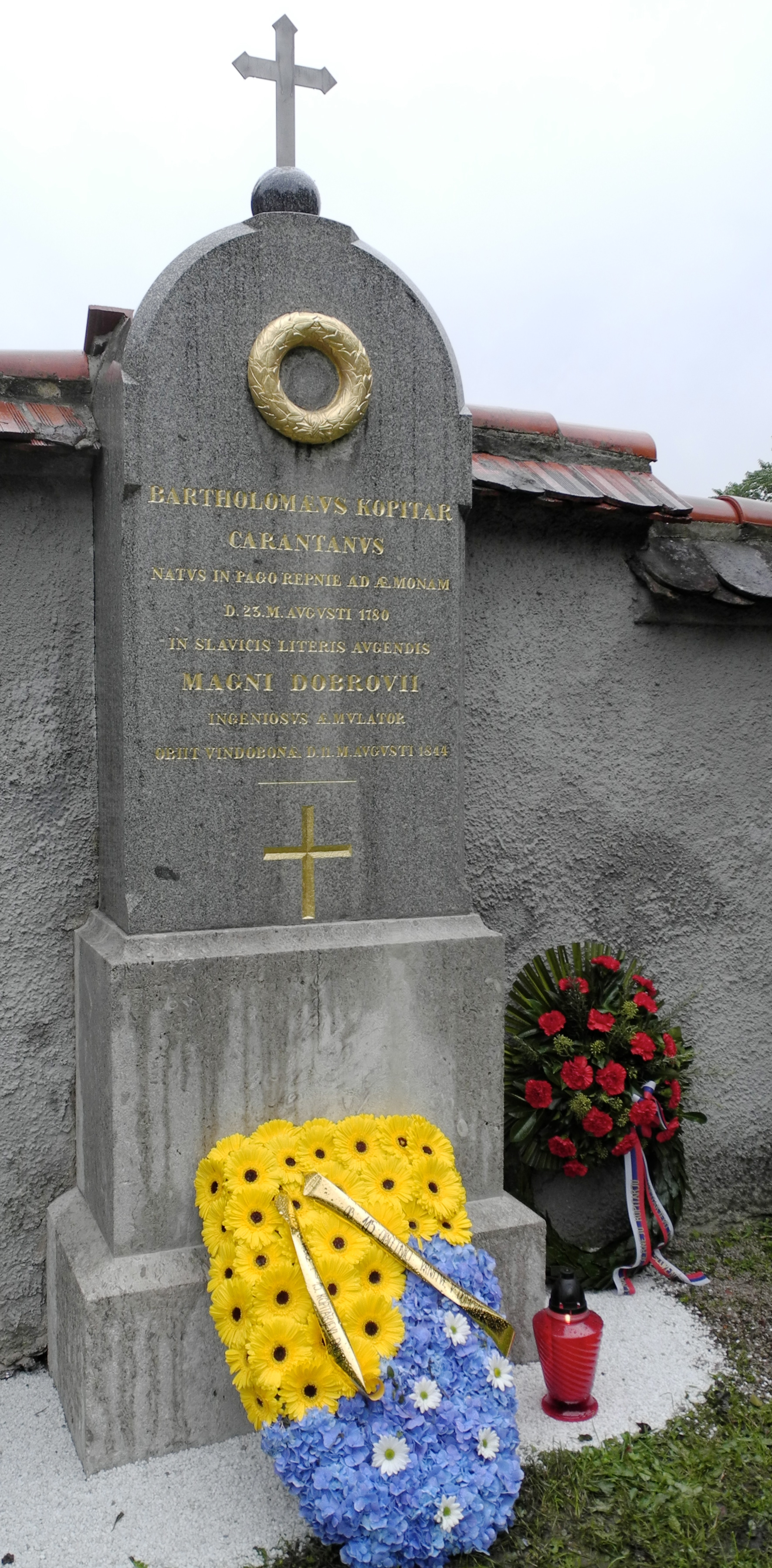
Gravestone of Jernej Kopitar in Navje Memorial Park in Ljubljana.

Kopitar died in Vienna on 11 August 1844, reportedly with Karadžić standing at his deathbed. He was buried in St. Marx Cemetery in Vienna, and the theologian Michal Josef Fessl had a gravestone for Kopitar erected there in October 1845. Kopitar's remains and gravestone were moved to St. Christopher's Cemetery in Ljubljana in 1897. In 1955, Kopitar's remains were transferred to Navje Memorial Park, where his gravestone is also now displayed, at the edge of the former St. Christopher's Cemetery. A neighbourhood in Belgrade, the capital of Serbia, called Kopitareva Gradina, is named after him.
