= Ilija Arnautović =

Serbian and Yugoslav architect

- Born: 7 July 1924; Niš, Kingdom of Serbs, Croats, and Slovenes (now Serbia)
- Died: 23 January 2009 (aged 84); Ljubljana, Slovenia
- Engineering career
- Discipline: Architect
- Projects: Bežigrad neighbourhood number 3

Bežigrad neighbourhood number 3

Ilija Arnautović (7 July 1924 – 23 January 2009) was a Serbian and Yugoslav architect, known for many projects from the 1960s to 1980s in Serbia and Slovenia. He was born in Niš, Kingdom of Serbs, Croats, and Slovenes, and died in Ljubljana, Slovenia.

Arnautović studied architecture from 1945 to 1948 in Prague, and from 1948 to 1953 in Ljubljana. He obtained his master's degree in 1952 under the guidance of Edvard Ravnikar. His architecture was based on thoughtful use of construction principles, construction techniques, and materials. His works are found throughout the former Yugoslavia and Algeria. He worked and lived in Ljubljana.

== Works ==
His works include:

- 1954–1955: Planning the Ljubljana Exhibition and Convention Centre
- 1962: Skyscrapers on Linhart Street, Savsko neighbourhood, Ljubljana
- 1965: Houses in Podgora, Ljubljana
- 1967: Three-story apartment buildings on Šiška Street, Ljubljana
- 1970: Apartment buildings on Črtomir Street, Savsko neighbourhood, Ljubljana
- 1970–1974: Blok 28, Belgrade
- 1973: Four buildings called "slepi Janez" on Šiška Street, Ljubljana
- 1977: Project for the Hotel Obir***, 48 rooms in Bad Eisenkappel, Austria
- 1977: Five-story apartment buildings in BS-3, Ljubljana
- 1981: Skyscrapers on Vojko Street, BS-3, Ljubljana
- 1983–1986: Zhun II, Oran, Algeria
