= Sigmund Zois =

Slovenian scientist

Sigmund Zois by Janez Andrej Herrlein

Sigmund Zois Freiherr von Edelstein, usually referred as Sigmund Zois (Slovenized: Žiga Zois, formerly Slovenized as Cojs or Cojz;) (23 November 1747 – 10 November 1819) was a Carniolan nobleman, natural scientist and patron of the arts. He is considered one of the most influential figures of the Enlightenment Era in the Slovene Lands of Habsburg Austria.

== Family ==
Sigmund's father Michelangelo Zois (1694–1777) was a merchant from Lombardy that moved to Ljubljana, where he made a considerable fortune in dealing with iron and holding mines. His second marriage was to a Carniolan noblewoman from the family Kappus (also Kapus) von Pichelstein; he was ennobled in 1739 and acquired the right to the title of baron in 1760. He owned large estates both in Carniola and on the Karst Plateau, and Sigmund was born in Trieste, in one of his father's mansions.

The Carniolan noble family Kappus von Pichelstein on Zois's mother's side was a prosperous family that had lived at Kamna Gorica in Upper Carniola for centuries, where the family had owned an iron foundry and an iron mine since the late Middle Ages, perhaps since the 12th century. Marcus Antonius Kappus von Pichelstein (1657–1717) worked as a Jesuit missionary in Sonora. From there he wrote letters to his friends in Vienna and to his relatives in Carniola. In these letters he described discoveries by research expeditions in Arizona and California and described the living conditions, the climate, and other details. Carolus Josephus Kappus von Pichelstein, a nephew of Marcus Antonius, was member of the Academia Operosorum, which was founded in Ljubljana in 1693 after the example of similar academies in Italy. Vladimir Kappus von Pichelstein (1885–1943), a Slovene writer and publisher, was also from the Kappus family. He was killed in May 1943 by communist Partisans.

== Education ==
After attending several private schools, Sigmund Zois moved to Reggio in the duchy of Modena where he continued his education. He enjoyed traveling and making new acquaintances. However, his way of life was soon truncated by gout, a disease with which he would be stricken the rest of his life. After returning to Ljubljana to assist in business, he studied natural sciences with Gabriel Gruber and Giuseppe Maffei and inherited his father's wealth in 1777. Leaving the management of his economic entities to his cousin, he developed a strong interest in sciences and started to meet with Baltazar Hacquet, who taught anatomy in Ljubljana from 1773 to 1787, and several Slovene intellectuals of the time.

== The Zois circle ==
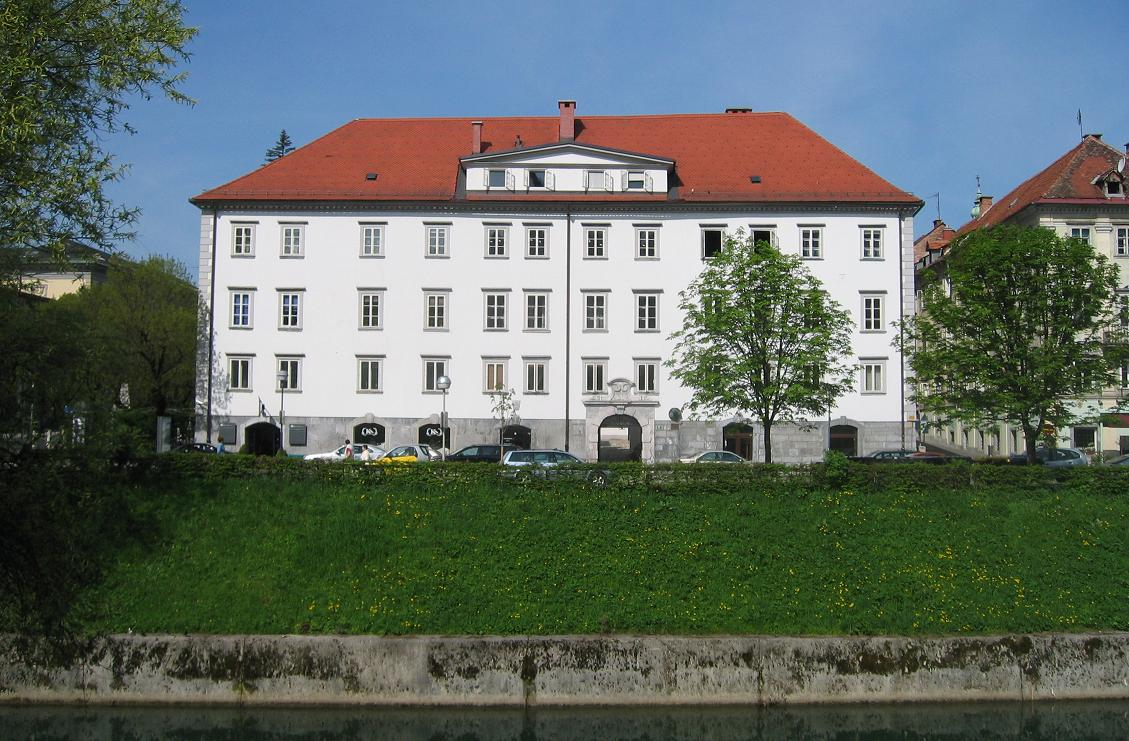
Zois Mansion in Ljubljana

In the early 1780s, his mansion in Ljubljana became a fostering center for liberal intellectuals at the center of the Slovene enlightenment. Jurij Japelj and Blaž Kumerdej (the two published the Bible in Slovene), Anton Tomaž Linhart, Valentin Vodnik (from 1793) and Jernej Kopitar (from 1803) were the most prominent members of what became known as the “Zois circle”. Zois was their patron, mentoring them and granting them necessary financial support for their cultural and scientific efforts, thus becoming the central figure of the Slovenian enlightenment. He was a deist and his views were rational and empirical. Nevertheless, he strongly opposed the French Revolution and supported the moderate enlightened constitutionalism of Leopold II.

In Ljubljana, Zois initiated and sponsored the construction of roads, the foundation of the botanical garden and a (German) theatre (whose main shareholder he became) and the enlargement of the lyceal library. His great commitment in sciences contrasted in neglecting the needs of the farmers on his estates, who waged surrection in 1783 and were oppressed by Zois' managers. Only after the French Revolution he ordered obligation towards his subjects, fearing for his properties.

In 1784, Zois was visited by the French geologist and mineralogist Déodat Gratet de Dolomieu. From 1797 onwards, Sigmund Zois used a wheelchair and didn't leave his mansion in Ljubljana anymore.

The literary opus of Sigmund Zois, of modest quality and little influence, includes many literary forms and genres, ranging from arias for the opera to lyrics for folk music, although probably only a minor part of his work has been preserved. His translation of the poem Lenore by Gottfried August Burger was regarded as a complete failure, and Zois himself later came to the conclusion that Slovene was "too mediocre and rough" to allow for such a literary achievement. He would be disproven only some decades later by France Prešeren who managed to compose a complex and exceptional translation of the same poem. Zois is also regarded as a father of Slovene literary criticism, and most of his literary reviews can be found in his correspondence with Valentin Vodnik.

Zois, who was considered to have been the wealthiest Carniolan of his time, died in Ljubljana. His funeral was attended by a huge crowd; to these days, it has been considered one of the biggest funeral ceremonies ever held in the city, together with Anton Aškerc's funeral in 1912, and Janez Evangelist Krek's funeral in 1917.

== Scientific and collecting work ==
Zois was particularly known as a mineralogist and geologist. In 1795, he mounted two expeditions to explore the land around the Triglav mountain. In 1805, Abraham Gottlob Werner described the mineral zoisite and named it after Zois, who sent him its specimens from Saualpe in Carinthia. His collection of minerals (around 5,000 items) is kept at the Natural History Museum of Slovenia.

He was also involved in botany and zoology. His ornithological writings, particularly Nomenclatura carniolica, contain the first records of Slovene names of the majority of the birds living in Carniola and were the foundation for the Slovene ornithological nomenclature. He supported the work of his brother, the botanist Karl Zois, who, among other things, discovered the Campanula zoysii, a previously unknown Carniolan flower.

== Orders, decorations and medals ==
- Commander's Cross of the Order of Leopold

The highest national scientific award in Slovenia, as well as a state-founded scholarship for talented students, are named after him.

== Sources ==
- Peter von Radics, at: Allgemeine deutsche Biographie (General German Biography), ed. Bayerische Akademie der Wissenschaften (Bavarian Academy of Sciences), Volume 45, Munich, 1900, p. 403

== See also ==
- Brdo pri Kranju
