= Repnje =

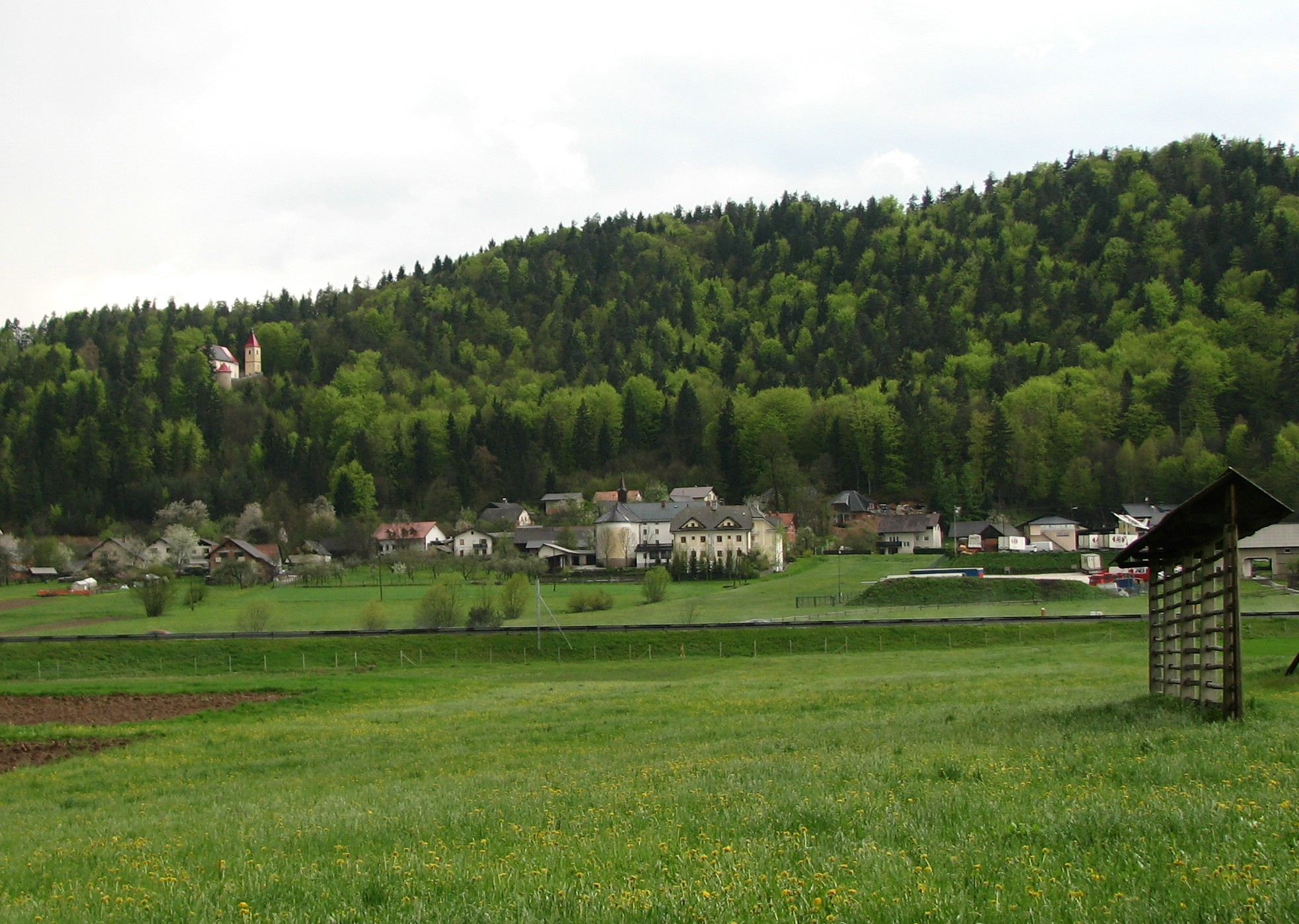

- Location in Slovenia
- Coordinates: 46°10′15.42″N 14°28′51.84″E
- Country: Slovenia
- Traditional region: Upper Carniola
- Statistical region: Central Slovenia
- Municipality: Vodice

Area
  - Total: 2.65 km^{2} (1.02 sq mi)
- Elevation: 346 m (1,135 ft)

Population (2002)
  - Total: 288

Repnje (pronounced [ˈɾeːpnjɛ]; German: Repne) is a village in the Municipality of Vodice in the Upper Carniola region of Slovenia.

In the centre of the village is Repnje Castle, built in the late 19th century. It now houses a Franciscan convent with an adjacent church.

== Church ==
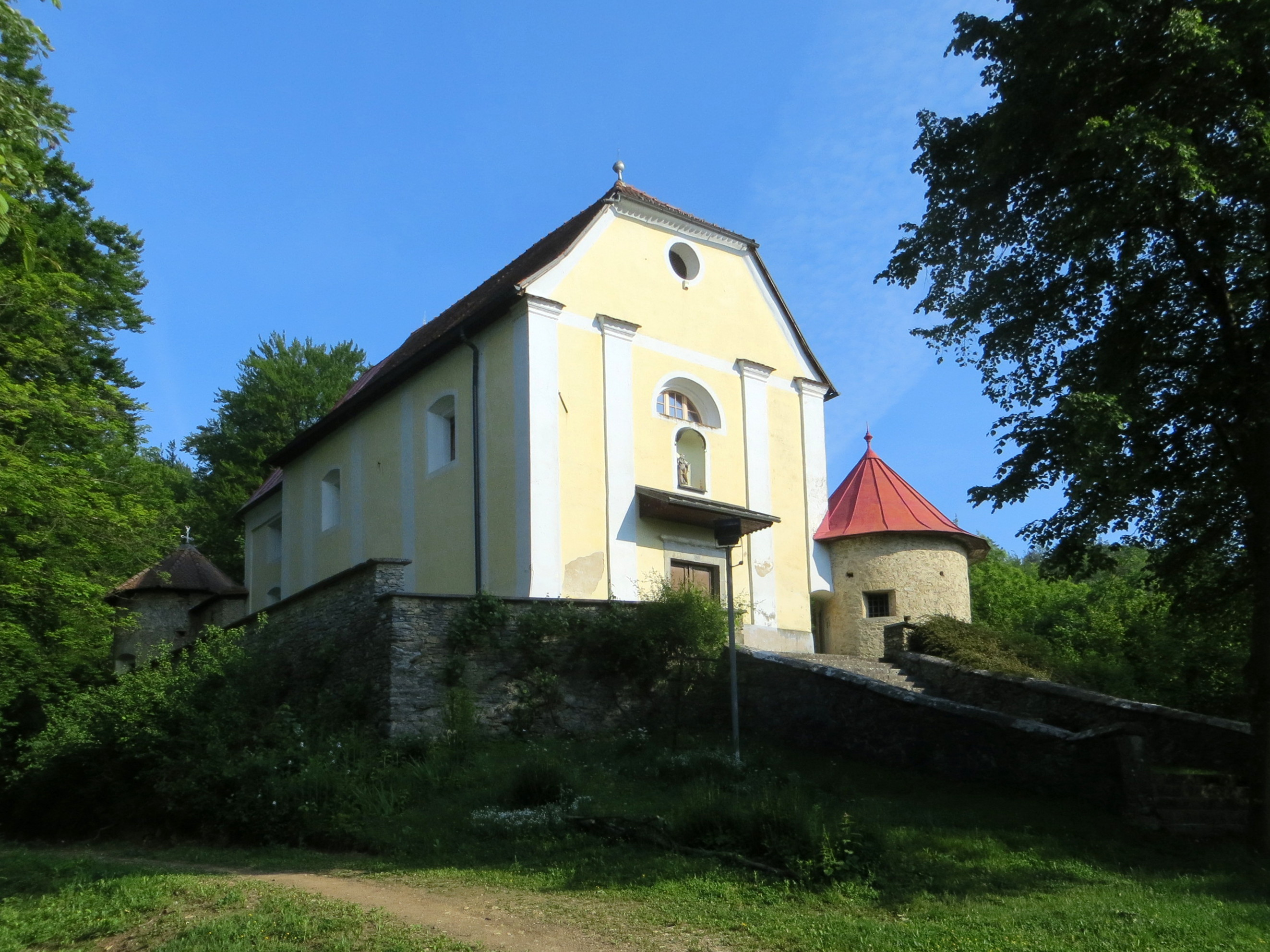
Saint Giles' Church

The main church of the settlement is built on a hill above the village. It is dedicated to Saint Giles and a portion of its defense wall, built against Ottoman raids, still survives today.

== Notable people ==
Notable people that were born or lived in Repnje include:

- Jernej Kopitar (1780–1844), linguist
