= Brdo Castle near Kranj =

Mansion and government venue in northwestern Slovenia

Coordinates: 46°16′23″N 14°22′37″E

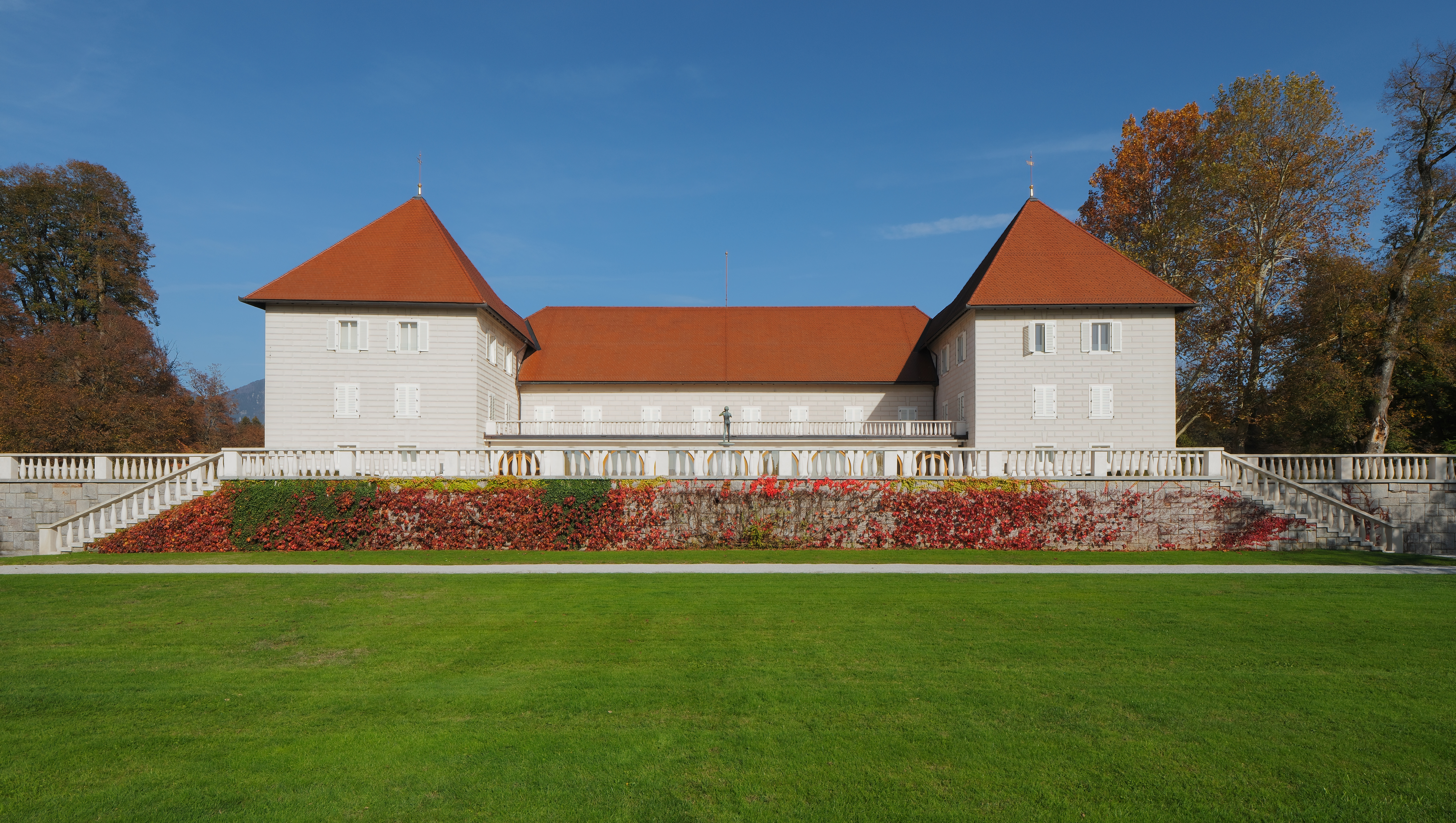
Brdo Castle

Logo of Brdo Castle

Brdo Castle near Kranj (Slovene: grad Brdo pri Kranju, German: Egg bei Krainburg), usually simply Brdo Castle (Slovene: grad Brdo), is an estate and a mansion in the Slovenian region of Upper Carniola west of the village of Predoslje, City Municipality of Kranj, northwest of Ljubljana. It is the Slovenian government's main venue for diplomatic meetings and other government-sponsored events.

== Name ==
Brdo was attested in written sources as Eck in 1430, Egkh in 1490, and Ekh in 1499.

== History ==
The present mansion was built by Carniolan nobleman Georg (Jurij) Egkh, general administrator of Habsburg private estates in the Duchy of Carniola, upon the permission by Maximillian I issued in 1510. It was the first Renaissance castle in the Duchy of Carniola, though it has been frequently renovated since. In the 18th century, it was bought by Michelangelo Zois, father of the Carniolan Enlightenment patron of the arts and natural scientist Sigmund Zois. In the 19th century, its interior was completely renovated. In the first decades of the 20th century, it fell into decay until it was bought by Prince Paul of Yugoslavia in 1935. Prince Paul transformed Brdo from an eclectic and biedermeier provincial mansion into a refined summer royal residence. Between 1935 and 1941, several prominent individuals stayed as guests at Brdo, including Edward VIII of the United Kingdom.

After Yugoslavia became a communist state in 1945, the mansion was confiscated from the Karađorđević dynasty and in 1947 after being nationalised became a summer retreat of the Yugoslav leader Josip Broz Tito. Brdo and the Vila Bled at the nearby Lake Bled were two former royal residences he typically spent much time in spring and summer. During one such visit in the spring of 1980, Tito suffered a seizure at Brdo and was transferred to the Ljubljana University Medical Centre, where he later died.

After Tito's death in 1980, the estate was transferred to the Socialist Republic of Slovenia and it was later inherited by the Government of the independent Slovenian state. In its traditional role of hosting national and international conferences, in 1990, it was the venue of a conference between the leaders of the six Yugoslav republics in an unsuccessful attempt to prevent the dissolution of the federation.

On June 16, 2001, it hosted a summit between George W. Bush and Vladimir Putin, which was the first official meeting between the two leaders. During Slovenia's EU presidency in the first half of 2008, it was the venue of a series of top-level international meetings.

The interior of the mansion is decorated with paintings, frescos and sculptures by prominent Slovene artists, such as Božidar Jakac, Maksim Sedej, Boris Kalin, Zdenko Kalin, and Karel Putrih.

The Brdo Congress Centre, built for the Slovenian Presidency of the Council of the European Union in 2008, is located in the Brdo compound, near the Renaissance castle complex. It has an area of 10,200 square metres (110,000 sq ft). The new glass building is set in the midst of a protected natural forest. The building was designed by the architects Matija Bevk and Vasa Perović.

== Ownership dispute ==
Ownership of the castle is disputed. The descendants of Prince Paul have argued that the confiscation was illegal and that the property should be returned to them. Their claim was rejected by a lower court in 2011, and the appeal was rejected by a higher court in April 2012. As of 2013, the claimants were still attempting to have the ruling overturned by the Supreme Court of Slovenia.

== See also ==
- Zois Mansion
- Turn Castle

== Sources ==
- Gregor Moder et al., Brdo pri Kranju (Ljubljana: Zavod za varstvo kulturne dediščine Slovenije, 2004).
- Ivan Stopar, Gradovi na Slovenskem (Ljubljana: Cankarjeva založba, 1991).
