= Nove Stožice =

Settlement in Ljubljana, Slovenia

Coordinates: 46°04′43″N 14°31′06″E

Apartments buildings at Trebinje Street

Nove Stožice, also known as the Bežigrad Neighbourhood Number 3 (BS3), is a living settlement in the Bežigrad District of Ljubljana, Slovenia.

Nove Stožice is located at the end of Vojko Street (Vojkova cesta), where is a turn-around point for the Ljubljana Passenger Transport bus number 20. On the left side, there is a settlement along the city highway.

There is a world trade center building along Vienna Street (Dunajska cesta), the Austrian Painter Trend 4 star hotel, a gas station and the Automobile Association of Slovenia headquarters. From Vienna Street to the Baraga Street closer to the city centre there is the Autocommerce building.

The complex of buildings on the four main streets in Nove Stožice (Puh Street, Trebinj Street, Marolt Street and Rebolj Street) consist of 4-floor high apartment-buildings, designed by the architect Ilija Arnautović in 1976-1978 and a complex of two 20-floors high skyscrapers, designed by the same architect in 1981.
