= Jurij Japelj =

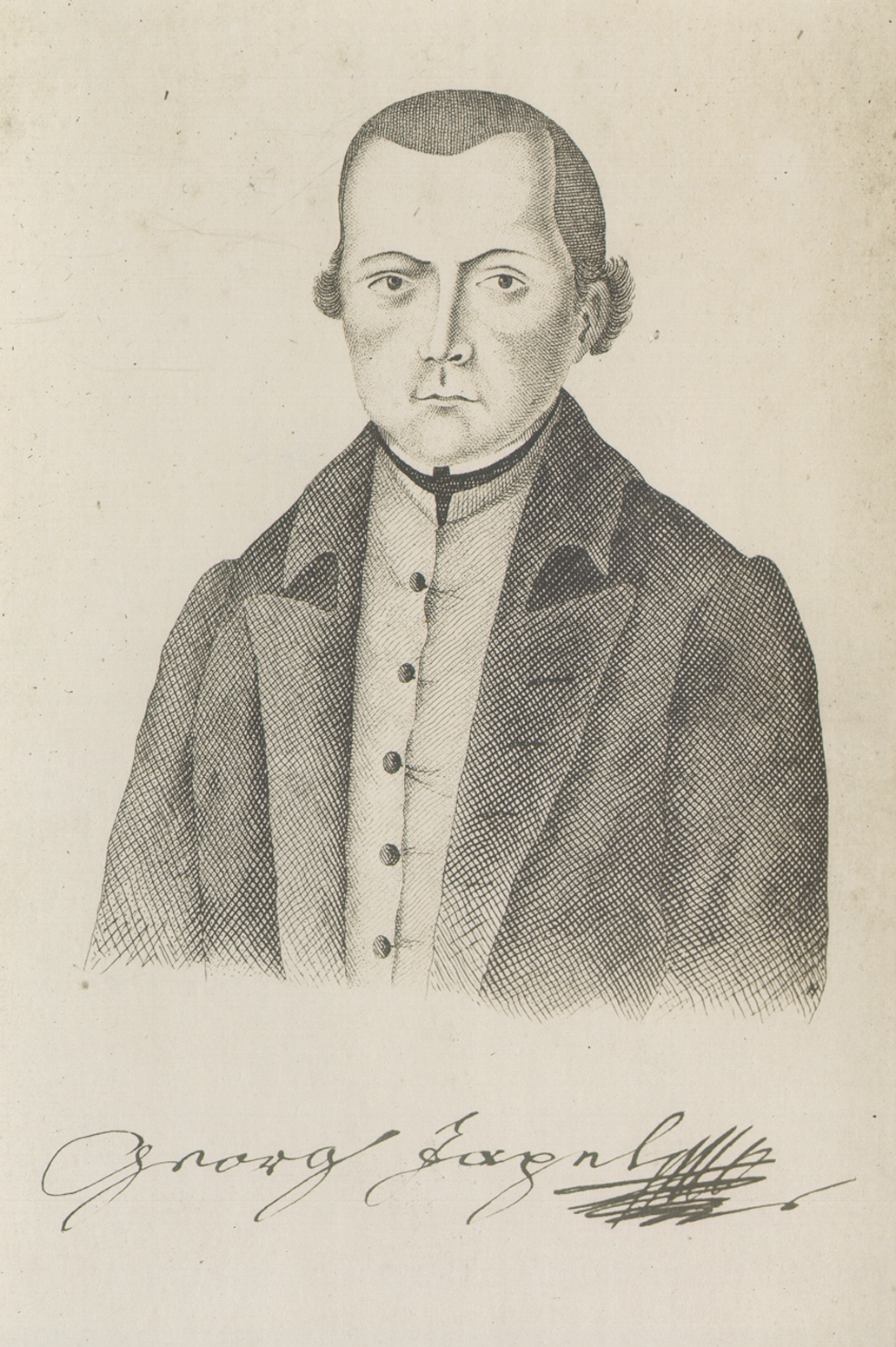
Engraved portrait of Jurij Japelj

Jurij Japelj, also known in German as Georg Japel, (11 April 1744 – 11 October 1807) was a Slovene Jesuit priest, translator, and philologist. He was part of the Zois circle, a group of Carniolan scholars and intellectuals that were instrumental in the spread of Enlightenment ideas in the Slovene Lands. His translations of the Bible, based on the 16th-century translation of the Lutheran author Jurij Dalmatin, set the basis for the development of modern standard Slovene.

== Life and work ==
Born in the Upper Carniolan town of Kamnik, then part of the Habsburg monarchy (now in Slovenia), he studied in Jesuit schools in Ljubljana, Gorizia, and Graz. He was ordained a Roman Catholic priest in 1769 in Trieste, where he served until the Suppression of the Jesuits in 1773. He then became the personal secretary of Bishop of Ljubljana Johann Karl von Herberstein. Under Herberstein's influence, Japelj became sympathetic to Jansenist ideas.

With the support of Bishop Herberstein, Japelj started translating religious texts into Slovene. He rejected the innovations of the Franciscan friar Marko Pohlin, and returned to the language of 16th-century Slovene Protestants, especially Jurij Dalmatin and Adam Bohorič. Together with Blaž Kumerdej, he began a new translation of the Bible in Slovene, based on Jurij Dalmatin's translation from the 1580s.

In 1807, he started compiling a grammar of Slovene, which, however, remained unfinished. He also translated several poems by Metastasio, Kleist, Racine, Hagedorn, and Pope into Slovene. He also wrote some original poems in a mixture of Classicism, Roccoco, and Sentimentalism.

In 1799, Japelj became the director of the seminary in Klagenfurt, where he also covered other positions in the ecclesiastical and civil administration. He died in Klagenfurt in 1807, shortly after being appointed bishop of Trieste.

== Sources ==
- Janko Kos, Slovenska književnost (Ljubljana: Cankarjeva založva, 1982), 122-123.
