= Bežigrad District =

Coordinates: 46°03′57″N 14°30′39″E

- District
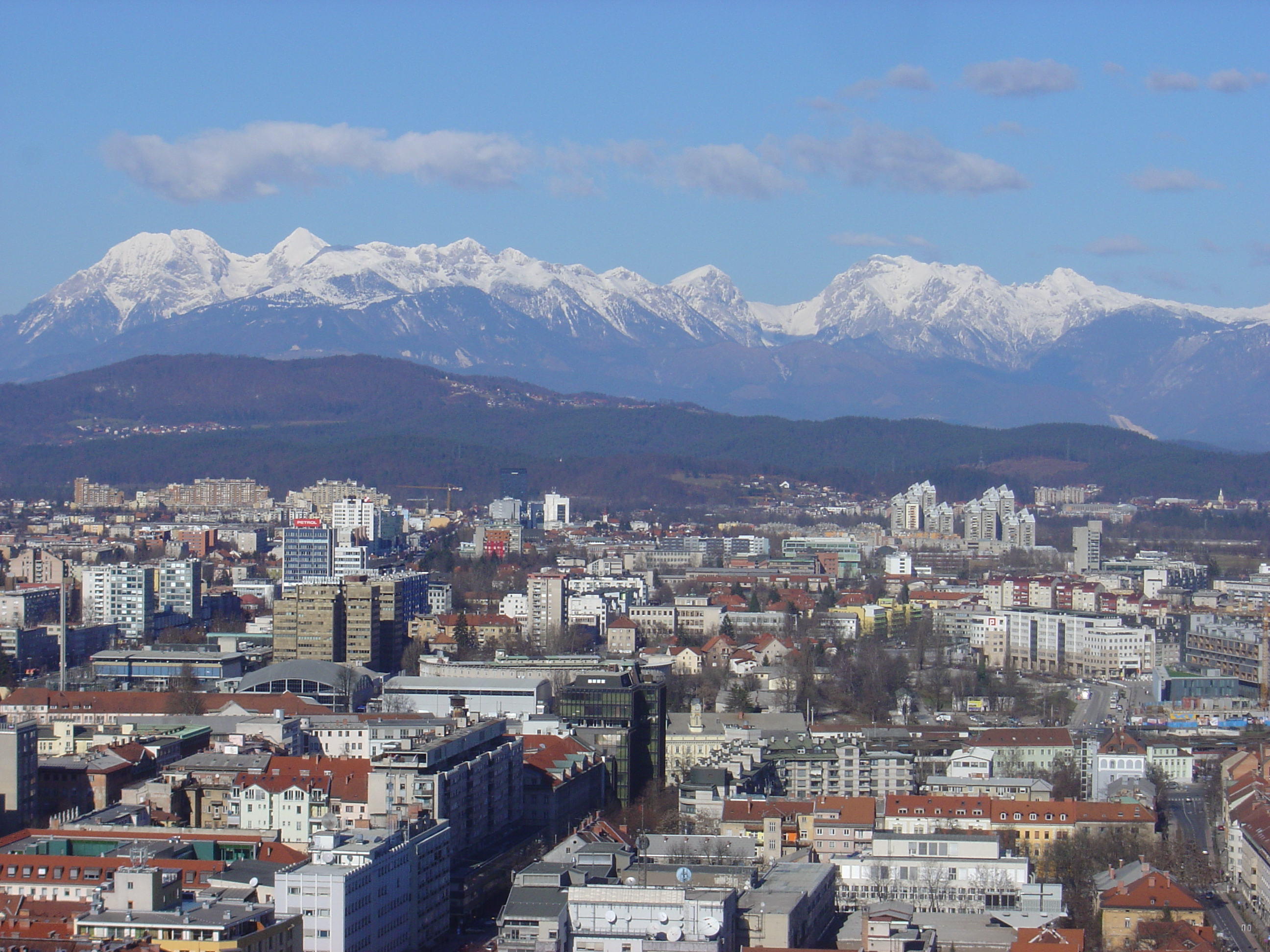
- The northern edge of Ljubljana's center (foreground) and Bežigrad (middle), beneath the Kamnik Alps (in 2008)
- Interactive map of Bežigrad District
- Country: Slovenia
- Region: Central Slovenia
- City: Ljubljana

Area
  - Total: 7.2 km^{2} (2.8 sq mi)

Population
  - Total: 32,691
  - Density: 4,500/km^{2} (12,000/sq mi)
- Time zone: UTC+1 (CET)
  - Summer (DST): UTC+2 (CEST)

The Bežigrad District (Slovene: Četrtna skupnost Bežigrad), or simply Bežigrad, is a district (mestna četrt) of the City Municipality of Ljubljana. Spanning an area of 7.2 km^{2} (2.8 sq mi), it encompasses the northern part of Ljubljana, the capital of Slovenia, between the southern rail line to the south, the Upper Carniola (or Kamnik) rail line to the west, the highway loop to the north, and Šmartno Street (Šmartinska cesta) and Žale Cemetery to the east. It extends on both sides of Vienna Street (Dunajska cesta), which is its central axis and main traffic artery. In the narrow sense, it includes the neighborhoods of Bežigrad, Brinje, Nove Stožice ('New Stožice', also known as BS3), and Sava Development (Savsko naselje). In a broader sense, Bežigrad is sometimes considered to include the northern Ljubljana suburbs of Stožice, Ježica, and the Črnuče District.

Bežigrad is primarily a residential district. Along Vienna Street there are some sections with high concentrations of shops and businesses. There is a small industrial zone in the northwest part of the district. Its buildings are generally low (up to six floors), and single-family dwellings and raw houses predominate. Larger communities of apartment buildings are concentrated on the district's eastern edge, in Nove Stožice and the Sava Development.

Important institutions and features of Bežigrad include the Slovenian Environmental Agency, the Stožice Sports Park and the Stožice Stadium, the Bežigrad Central Stadium designed by Jože Plečnik, the Bežigrad Secondary School, Navje Cemetery, Plečnik's unfinished Academic Collegium (intended to serve as the Baraga Seminary), Žale Cemetery, and the Ljubljana Fairgrounds. The older part of Bežigrad has many large houses from the interwar period. Savings Bank Street (Hranilniška ulica) stands out in particular. It is the oldest street in Bežigrad, created in the 1880s. There is also the Islamic Religious and Cultural Center, the first mosque in Slovenia, known as the Ljubljana Mosque, completed in February 2020.
