= Slovene Lands =

Areas where the Slovene language is spoken

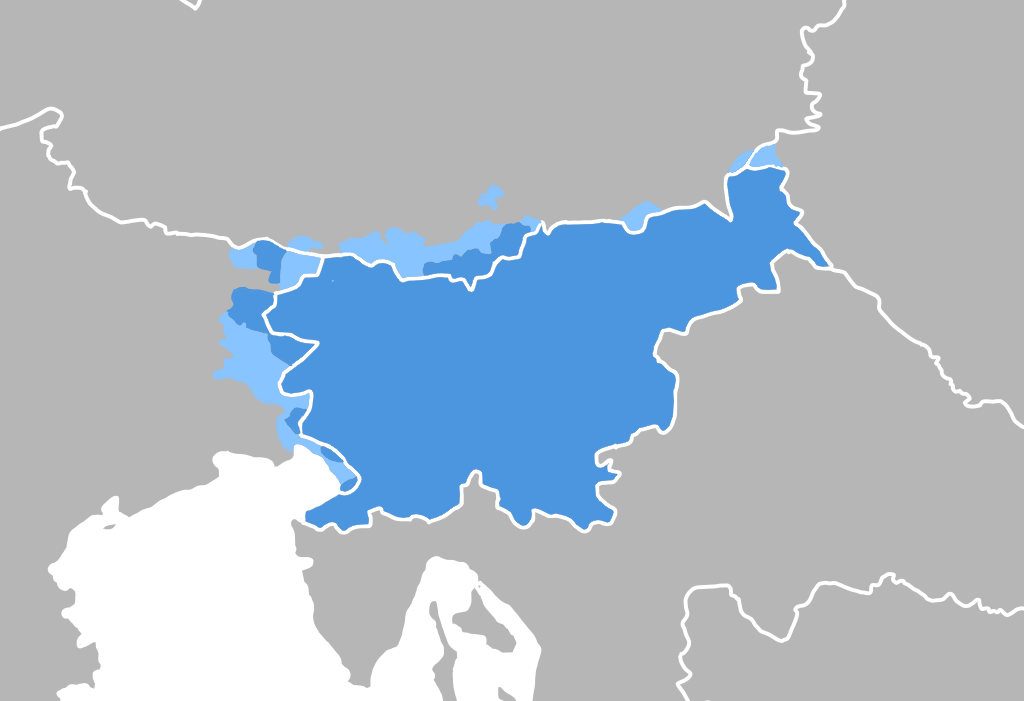

The Slovene lands or Slovenian lands (Slovene: Slovenske dežele or in short Slovensko) is the historical denomination for the territories in Central and Southern Europe where people primarily spoke Slovene. The Slovene lands were part of the Illyrian provinces, the Austrian Empire and Austria-Hungary (in Cisleithania). They encompassed Carniola, southern part of Carinthia, southern part of Styria, Istria, Gorizia and Gradisca, Trieste, and Prekmurje. Their territory more or less corresponds to modern Slovenia and the adjacent territories in Italy, Austria, Hungary, and Croatia, where autochthonous Slovene minorities live. The areas surrounding present-day Slovenia were never homogeneously ethnically Slovene.

== Terminology ==
Like the Slovaks, the Slovenes preserve the self-designation of the early Slavs as their ethnonym. The term Slovenia ("Slovenija") was not in use prior to the early 19th century, when it was coined for political purposes by the Slovene romantic nationalists, most probably by some pupils of the linguist Jernej Kopitar. It started to be used only from the 1840s on, when the quest for a politically autonomous United Slovenia within the Austrian Empire was first advanced during the Spring of Nations. "Slovenia" became a de facto distinctive administrative and political entity for the first time in 1918, with the unilateral declaration of the State of Slovenes, Croats and Serbs.

Although Slovenia did not exist as an autonomous administrative unit between 1921 and 1941, the Drava Banovina of the Kingdom of Yugoslavia was frequently called simply "Slovenia", even in some official documents.

Consequently, most Slovene scholars prefer to refer to the "Slovene lands" in English rather than "Slovenia" to describe the territory of modern Slovenia and neighbouring areas in earlier times. The use of the English term "Slovenia" is generally considered by Slovene scholars to be anachronistic due to its modern origin.

== Geographical extension ==
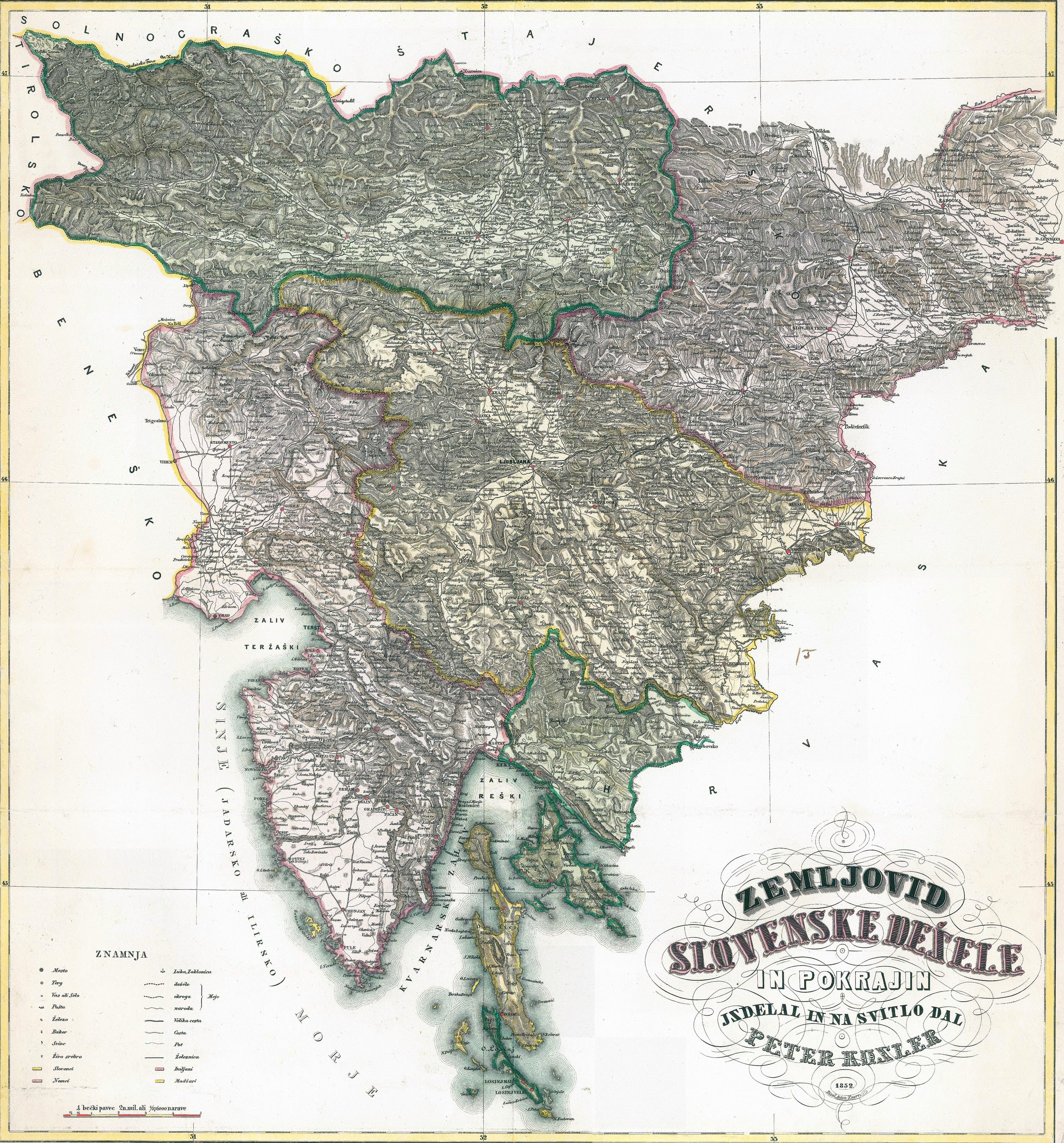
Peter Kosler's "Map of Slovene Land and Provinces", drawn during the Spring of Nations in 1848 and published only in 1861, was the first map of the Slovene lands as a territorial unit.

In the 19th century, the territories regarded as part of the Slovene lands were:

- Carniola
- southern Carinthia
- Lower Styria
- Slovene March in the Vas county of the Kingdom of Hungary, and the adjacent zones of the Zala county (Beltinci, Turnišče, Velika Polana, Kobilje)
- Jennersdorf in the Kingdom of Hungary (now in Burgenland, Austria);
- most of the County of Gorizia and Gradisca, except for the lowlands south-west of Gradisca and Cormons, which were already part of historical Friuli
- the Imperial Free City of Trieste, a city in modern Italy
- northern Istria, in the modern municipalities of Koper, Izola, Piran, Hrpelje-Kozina, Muggia and Dolina
- Venetian Slovenia (Italian: Slavia Vèneta), until 1797 part of the Republic of Venice, later Kingdom of Lombardy–Venetia
- Croatia–Slovenia border disputes

The Žumberak and the area around Čabar, which today belong to Croatia, were long part of the Duchy of Carniola, and thus generally regarded as part of the Slovene lands, especially prior to the emergence of Romantic nationalism in the 19th century, when the exact ethnic border between Slovenes and Croats had not yet been specified.

Not all of the territories referred to as the "Slovene lands" have always had a Slovene-speaking majority. Several towns, especially in Lower Styria, maintained a German-speaking majority until the late 1910s, most notably Maribor, Celje and Ptuj. The area around Kočevje in Lower Carniola, known as the Gottschee County, had a predominantly German-speaking population between the 14th century and 1941 when they were resettled in an agreement between Nazi German and Fascist Italian occupation forces. A similar German "linguistic island" within an ethnically Slovene territory existed in what is now the Italian comune of Tarvisio, but used to belong to the Duchy of Carinthia until 1919. The city of Trieste, whose municipal territory has been regarded by Slovenes to be an integral part of the Slovene lands, has always had a Romance-speaking majority (first Friulian, then Venetian and Italian). A similar case is that of the town of Gorizia, which served as a major religious center of the Slovene lands for centuries, but was inhabited by a mixed Italian-Slovene-Friulian-German population. The towns of Koper, Izola and Piran, surrounded by an ethnically Slovene population, were inhabited almost exclusively by Venetian-speaking Italians until the Istrian–Dalmatian exodus in the late 1940s and 1950s, as were large areas of the comune of Muggia. In southern Carinthia, a process of Germanization started by the end of the 1840s, creating several German-speaking areas within what had previously been a compact Slovene territory. Since the late 1950s, most of southern Carinthia has had a German-speaking majority, with the local Slovene minority living in a scattered pattern throughout the area.

On the other hand, other areas with historically important Slovene communities, such as the Croatian cities of Rijeka and Zagreb, as well as the Slovene villages in the Somogy county of Hungary (the Somogy Slovenes), were never regarded to be part of the Slovene lands. The same goes for the Slovene communities in south-west Friuli (in the villages of Gradisca, Gradiscutta, Gorizzo, Goricizza, Lestizza, and Belgrado in the lower Tagliamento area) which extinguished themselves by the end of the 16th century.

== See also ==
- History of Slovenia
- Carinthian Slovenes
- Hungarian Slovenes
- Slavia Friulana (Beneška Slovenija)
- Slovene minority in Italy (1920–1947)
