= Luka Milovanov Georgijević =

Serbian writer and philologist (1784–1828)

Luka Milovanov Georgijević (1784 – 1828) was a Serbian writer and philologist. In literature, he is considered the first children's poet of modern Serbian literature. He advised Vuk Karadžić on the production of grammars and the dictionary.

== Biography ==
Georgijević was born in eastern Bosnia, near Srebrenica, in the region of Osat in 1784. Two years after the birth of Luka, his father, Milovan, moved with his family to Srem, where he settled first in Čerević and then in Vinkovci. There, Luka went to grammar school, in Szeged he studied philosophy, and in Pest, he completed his law studies and became a jurist. We know that in 1810, when he wrote his important work, he was a teacher at a Serbian national school in the city of Pest, where he taught Sava Mrkalj.

Although hindered by unfortunate circumstances, Georgijević, who removed some superfluous letters in his works, may be considered among the first reformers (alongside Venclović, Dositej, and Mrkalj) of the Serbian alphabet.

In the winter of 1811, Georgijević visited Irmu in Imperial Russia, where he taught a group of choral singers mathematics. He became deaf after being caught in a blizzard there. As time went on, he not only lost his capacity to earn a living by giving lessons, but there was also a price on his mental health. In time, his alternating moods of exuberance and despair became more extreme; especially the periods of despair were longer and deeper. His outward appearance became more unkempt. His fits of despair sometimes left him moping in silence, but at other times they led to heavy drinking. It was an understandable cause, all connected with his loss of hearing.

In Buda, Luka met Vuk Karadžić in 1814, and Vuk sought to have Luka rearrange his manuscript, which Luka kept in very poor condition. Always in financial distress, Luka would take any type of writing job he could find, preparing writs and abstracts for paralegals and lawyers, and translating books first for Gligorije Dimić, a wealthy merchant, and later for Metropolitan Dionysios Papazoglou, to survive. Finally weakened and physically ill, he began to lose his sight as well and died in a terrible slum on 23 November 1828. Three Serbian women were taking turns to care for him in his last days. Luka Milovanov handed over to one of them his manuscript, telling her to give it to Vuk Karadžić. That woman turned out to be the future wife of Sima Milutinović Sarajlija, Marija Popović Punktatorka. Vuk described Luka as "a man of medium height, very humorous, and honest to a fault."

His contemporaries were poets and writers Lukijan Mušicki, Ivan Jugović, Sima Milutinović Sarajlija, Jeremija Gagić, Dimitrije Dimitrijević, Sava Mrkalj, Stevan Živković-Telemak, Pavle Solarić, and philologists Jernej Kopitar, Josef Dobrovský, Nicholas Révai (1750–1807), and Johann Christoph Adelung. Georgijević gave his support to Vuk and Kopitar long before the Serbian Language Controversy and both he and his pupil Sava Mrkalj shared the same vision about the language reform.

== Philological and literary work ==
Georgijević, a student of law and later a teacher in Pest composed a study on Serbian prosody in Pest in 1810, Opit nastavlenija k srbskoj sličnorečnosti i slogomerija ili prosidiji, but he came into sharp conflict with a censor and the church hierarchy and did not succeed in having his work printed during his lifetime; it is particularly important that he wrote it in the people's idiom, in a standard language, and for that purpose, he established the modern Serbian Cyrillic orthography adopted and propagated by Vuk Karadžić, the reformer of the modern Serbian (and Croatian) literary language. Unfortunately, the publication of Georgijević's work was held up by censors, and his work was published by the Armenian monastery printing press in Vienna in 1833, some five years posthumously. Vuk Karadžić considered Georgijević to be one of his teachers; he esteemed his work and published his manuscripts in a book only after Georgijević's death.

In Serbian literature, Georgijević is the forerunner of modern Serbian Cyrillic, in which Johann Christoph Adelung's rule is respected at the end: "write as you say". Luka Milovanov was the first aesthetic master for making verses. In Serbian literature, he occupies the position of the first children's poet. His original songs "On the New Year's Booklet" and "My Children on the Majals", written in 1810, mark the birth of modern Serbian literature for children. The theme of the first is the father's joy of donating to the little ones the best present for the New Year: a book like a hot new knowledge and gaming spirit. The poem radiates parental love and the desire to see the little ones rewarded. The other is a sign of love towards childhood, as the beauty of life. The verse is simple, naive, free, and adaptable. Lack of lexical and metaphors compensates for the lightness of expression and rhythm. By choosing the theme, the process, the feeling for verse, and rhythm, his style does not significantly differ from today's literature. After all, Georgijević followed the rules of classical prosody in his versification.
