= Vuk Karadžić Cultural Center =

- Центар за културу „Вук Караџић”
- Named after: Vuk Karadžić
- Founded: October 23, 1998; 26 years ago
- Founder: City of Loznica
- Type: Cultural center
- Legal status: Active
- Location: Save Kovačevića 1, Loznica
- Subsidiaries: Birth house of Vuk Karadžić; Vuk's House of Culture; Jadar Museum; Gallery of Mića Popović and Vera Božičković Popović
- Website: ckvkaradzic.org.rs

Vuk Karadžić Cultural Center (Serbian Cyrillic: Центар за културу „Вук Караџић”, romanized: Centar za kulturu „Vuk Karadžić”) is located in Loznica. It was founded on 23 October 1998 by the City of Loznica. The center is responsible for the birth house of Vuk Karadžić in Tršić, Jadar Museum, the gallery of Mića Popović and Vera Božičković Popović, Vuk's House of Culture and other historic and cultural places located on the territory of the City of Loznica. Together with the city of Loznica and Serbian Ministry of Culture and Information, the center is the organizer of Vukov sabor, the oldest cultural event in Serbia.
