= Vuk's reform =

Early 19th century reform of the Serbian Cyrillic alphabet

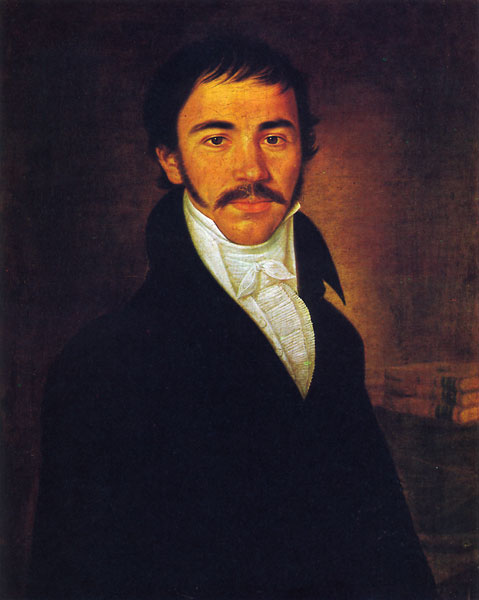
- Vuk Stefanović Karadžić, portrait by Pavel Đurković from 1816.
- Date: 1814–1868
- Location: Vienna, Austrian Empire Principality of Serbia
- Outcome: Standardization of the Serbian language on a vernacular basis; Introduction of phonemic orthography; Creation of the modern Serbian Cyrillic alphabet; Break with the Slavonic-Serbian linguistic tradition
- Participants: Reformers: Vuk Stefanović Karadžić; Sava Mrkalj; Jernej Kopitar; Đuro Daničić Conservatives: Serbian Orthodox Church; Stefan Stratimirović; Jovan Hadžić

Vuk's reform (Serbian: Вукова реформа, Vukova reforma) was a reform of the Serbian Cyrillic alphabet and orthography conducted by Vuk Stefanović Karadžić in the first half of the 19th century. The reform aimed to standardize the literary language based on vernacular speech, in accordance with the principle of "one letter, one sound" and the motto "write as you speak, and read as it is written". This decade-long process represented a radical break with the prevailing Slavonic-Serbian linguistic tradition, which was the language of the educated elite and the church but was unintelligible to the wider populace.

Vuk's work was built upon the earlier efforts of Sava Mrkalj and was carried out with the crucial support and guidance of the Slovenian linguist Jernej Kopitar. The reform officially began with the publication of Pismenica serbskoga jezika (Serbian Grammar) in 1814 and achieved a symbolic victory in 1847. However, Vuk's orthography was officially adopted in the Principality of Serbia only in 1868, four years after his death. The reform faced fierce opposition from church circles and the conservative intelligentsia but ultimately laid the foundation for the modern Serbian standard language.

== Background ==
Until the 18th century, the Serbs used two linguistic expressions: Serbian recension of Church Slavonic, the language of the church and medieval tradition, and the vernacular language. Due to historical circumstances and the position of Serbs in the southern Habsburg monarchy, the Serbian Orthodox Church created a distinct linguistic form known as Slavonic-Serbian.

In the latter half of the 18th century, with the advent of the Enlightenment, the unintelligibility of Slavonic-Serbian, especially in secular texts, became a growing problem. This created a need to adapt the language and script to the characteristics of Serbian vernacular speech, paving the way for linguistic reforms. Some authors, like Gavrilo Stefanović Venclović, had written in a language close to the vernacular as early as the beginning of the 18th century, but their works did not have a widespread impact.

== Key influences and the beginning of the reform ==
After the collapse of the First Serbian Uprising in 1813, Vuk Stefanović Karadžić (1787–1864) moved to Vienna. There, he met Jernej Kopitar, a prominent Slavist and censor for Slavic books in the Habsburg monarchy. Kopitar recognized Vuk's potential and became his mentor, guiding him toward collecting folk literature and working on language and orthography reform.

Kopitar introduced Vuk to the work of the German philologist Johann Christoph Adelung, whose phonetic principle, "write as you speak, and read as it is written," became the guiding idea of Vuk's reform. With Kopitar's help, Vuk published Pismenica serbskoga jezika po govoru prostoga naroda (Grammar of the Serbian Language According to the Speech of the Common People) in 1814, which laid out the foundations of his alphabet and orthography reform.

== Reform of the script and orthography ==
=== Sava Mrkalj ===
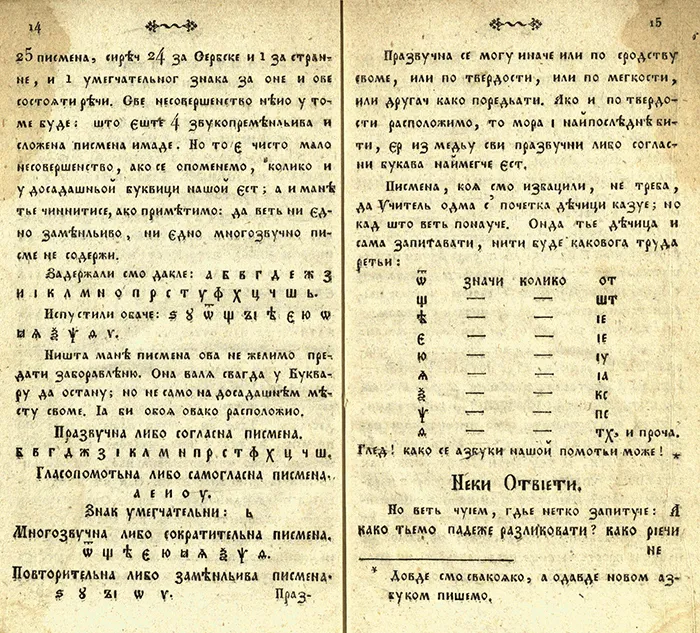
The 14th and 15th pages of the book Salo debeloga jera libo azbukoprotres, where Mrkalj outlines his proposed changes.

Before Vuk, the most significant reform attempt was made by Sava Mrkalj. In his 1810 booklet Salo debeloga jera libo azbukoprotres (The Zeal of the Thick Yer or the Alphabet Shaker), he proposed reducing the alphabet to 29 letters based on the phonetic principle. Mrkalj suggested removing all superfluous letters and introducing digraphs with the soft sign (ь) for palatal sounds, so that the letters њ, љ, ђ, ћ were written as нь, ль, дь, ть. However, due to strong opposition from church circles, led by Metropolitan Stefan Stratimirović, Mrkalj's reform was rejected, and he himself renounced his work under pressure.... Legend:

Removed letters

Table of changes made by Sava Mrkalj
| Church Slavonic Cyrillic (and pronunciation) | Mrkalj's Alphabet |
|---|---|
| А а | А а |
| Б б | Б б |
| В в | В в |
| Г г | Г г |
| Д д | Д д |
| Е е | Е е |
| Ѥ ѥ (je) | |
| Ж ж | Ж ж |
| Ѕ ѕ (zj) | |
| З з | З з |
| И и | И и |
| І ї (j) | І ї |
| К к | К к |
| Л л | Л л |
| М м | М м |
| Н н | Н н |
| О о | О о |
| Ѡ ѡ (o) | |
| Ѿ ѿ (ot) | |
| П п | П п |
| Р р | Р р |
| С с | С с |
| Т т | Т т |
| Ѳ ѳ (t) | |
| У у | У у |
| Ѹ ѹ (ou) | |
| Ф ф | Ф ф |
| Х х | Х х |
| Ц ц | Ц ц |
| Ч ч | Ч ч |
| Ш ш | Ш ш |
| Щ щ (sht) | |
| Ы ы (hard i) | |
| Ь ь | Ь ь |
| Ю ю (ju) | |
| Ꙗ, ꙗ (ja) | |
| Ѧ ѧ (ja) | |
| Ѫ ѫ (je) | |
| Ѣ ѣ (je) | |
| Ѯ ѯ (ks) | |
| Ѱ ѱ (ps) | |
| Ѵ ѵ (v, i) | |

=== Vuk Stefanović Karadžić ===
Vuk continued where Mrkalj left off, perfecting his ideas and fully implementing the phonetic principle. In his Pismenica of 1814 and later in the first edition of the Srpski rječnik (Serbian Dictionary) of 1818, Vuk finalized the reform of the alphabet:

- He removed all letters that did not have a corresponding sound in the vernacular.
- For six sounds that lacked a letter, Vuk devised new graphemes:
  - Љ (Lj) and Њ (Nj) were created by ligating the letters Л (L) and Н (N) with the soft sign (Ь).
  - Ђ (Đ) was adopted from a design by Lukijan Mušicki, by modifying the letter Ћ (Ć).
  - Ћ (Ć) was adopted from old Serbian manuscripts, modeled on the letter Derv (ꙉ).
  - Џ (Dž) was adopted from old Romanian manuscripts.
  - Ј (J) was adopted from the Latin alphabet, which caused the greatest resistance from church circles.
- He initially omitted the letter Х (H), believing it did not exist in vernacular speech, but later reinstated it in 1836 after realizing it was used in southern regions (Montenegro, Bosnia, Dubrovnik).

In this way, Vuk created a perfectly phonetic alphabet with 30 letters, where each sound corresponds to a single letter, and each letter represents a single sound.

Legend:
Removed letters
New letters

Table of changes made by Vuk Stefanović Karadžić
| Mrkalj's Alphabet | Vuk's Cyrillic |
|---|---|
| А а | А а |
| Б б | Б б |
| В в | В в |
| Г г | Г г |
| Д д | Д д |
| | Ђ ђ |
| Е е | Е е |
| Ж ж | Ж ж |
| З з | З з |
| И и | И и |
| І ї | Ј ј |
| К к | К к |
| Л л | Л л |
| | Љ љ |
| М м | М м |
| Н н | Н н |
| | Њ њ |
| О о | О о |
| П п | П п |
| Р р | Р р |
| С с | С с |
| Т т | Т т |
| | Ћ ћ |
| У у | У у |
| Ф ф | Ф ф |
| Х х | Х х |
| Ц ц | Ц ц |
| Ч ч | Ч ч |
| | Џ џ |
| Ш ш | Ш ш |
| Ь ь | |

== Opposition and the struggle for acceptance ==
Vuk's reform met with immense and prolonged resistance. Between 1814 and 1847, its victory was by no means certain. The main opponents were:

- The Serbian Orthodox Church: Led by Metropolitan Stefan Stratimirović of Karlovci, the church saw Vuk's reform as an attack on the tradition and sanctity of the Church Slavonic language. Opponents accused Vuk of attempting to Catholicize the Serbs by introducing the Latin letter 'j'.
- The Conservative Intelligentsia: The learned men of the time, led by Jovan Hadžić (pen name Miloš Svetić), considered the vernacular "vulgar" and "rustic," unworthy of literature and science.
- The Principality of Serbia: The authorities in Serbia, under the influence of the church, long forbade the printing of books in Vuk's orthography.

Vuk was primarily criticized for abandoning the Church Slavonic foundation, introducing "indecent" vernacular words into his Serbian Dictionary, and using the Eastern Herzegovinian dialect (Ijekavian) as the basis for the literary language. Despite everything, Vuk engaged in sharp polemics with his opponents and received support from esteemed European intellectuals, such as Jacob Grimm and Johann Wolfgang von Goethe, who were captivated by Serbian folk poetry.

== Victory of the reform and official recognition ==
The pivotal year for the victory of Vuk's ideas was 1847. In that year, a younger generation of Serbian intellectuals published four seminal works in the reformed vernacular language and Vuk's orthography, proving the language's capacity for the highest artistic and scholarly achievements:

1. The New Testament in Vuk's translation (which had awaited publication for nearly 27 years)
2. Pesme (Poems) by Branko Radičević
3. The Mountain Wreath by Petar II Petrović-Njegoš
4. Rat za srpski jezik i pravopis (The War for the Serbian Language and Orthography) by Đuro Daničić, a scholarly defense of Vuk's reform that ended the polemic with Jovan Hadžić.

This "Year of Vuk" marked the triumph of his ideas among the intellectual elite. However, another two decades had to pass for the reform to be officially accepted. In the Principality of Serbia, Vuk's orthography was made official in 1868, finally completing the reform. This success was facilitated by the Vienna Literary Agreement of 1850, where Serbian and Croatian intellectuals, including Vuk and Daničić, laid the groundwork for a common literary language.

== Political context and controversies ==
Contemporary research also points to the complex political context of the reform. Some historians, such as Miloslav Samardžić, argue that Vuk's reform was part of a strategic plan by the Austrian Empire, executed by Jernej Kopitar. The goal was to separate the Serbs from Russian cultural and political influence, which was spread through the church and the Slavonic-Serbian language, and to bring them closer to the Catholic Slavs within the Monarchy. In letters to the Austrian authorities, Kopitar explained that Vuk, by fighting against the Orthodox clergy, was "unintentionally and unconsciously also working in Austria's favor".

These theses are controversial but are supported by documentation indicating political motives behind the support for Vuk. Additionally, some authors dispute Vuk's claim about the complete unintelligibility of the older language, citing examples from medieval literature and the works of writers like Gavrilo Stefanović Venclović, which they argue demonstrate a continuity between the vernacular and literary expression.

== Vuk's non-philological work ==
Besides his language reform, Vuk Stefanović Karadžić made enormous contributions in other fields, notably in ethnography and anthropology, where his pioneering work laid the foundation for future studies in Serbian cultural heritage. He meticulously collected and published a vast array of folk songs, stories, proverbs, and customs, thus preserving invaluable elements of Serbian oral tradition that might otherwise have been lost to time. His biographies of notable Serbs, such as the story of Hajduk Veljko, are not only historically significant but also possess exceptional literary value, reflecting his deep engagement with the national identity and history. Vuk's extensive correspondence with intellectuals across Europe, from London to Saint Petersburg, established him as a key cultural figure and an "institution in himself," representing Serbian culture on the international stage during his lifetime. His influence extended beyond Serbia, as evidenced by his recognition in German-speaking countries, where his work was studied and appreciated, further cementing his legacy as a cultural bridge between Serbia and Europe. Through his ethnographic and anthropological efforts, Vuk Stefanović Karadžić not only preserved the Serbian cultural heritage but also contributed to the broader understanding of Slavic traditions and folklore, making him a seminal figure in the study of Balkan cultures.
