= Sunce se djevojkom ženi =

Work of Serbian folk poetry

"Sunce se djevojkom ženi" ('The Sun marries the girl') is a mythological lyric of Serbian folk literature. It dates from the Middle Ages. This lyric was recorded by Vuk Stefanović Karadžić in the 19th century in the ijekavian accent of Shtokavian dialect. "Sunce se djevojkom ženi" is in the curriculum for high schools in Serbia (in readers).

== Content ==
The song is about the sublime beauty of a girl, who is quite conceited about it. She provokes the sun in the following verse: "Bright sun, I am more beautiful than you". (Sun symbolizes the source of life on earth, heat, light...). Then, there is the motive of passion for the beauty of the maiden of sun when it has seen the beautiful maiden. After, the sun has taken away the girl to take her as its lover; from the girl, then, became the morning star.

== Literature ==
- Reader for 1st class of High schools; authors: Mr Ljiljana Nikolić, Bosiljka Milić, Institute for Textbooks and Teaching Aids, Belgrade (Original Title: ЧИТАНКА са књижевнотеоријским појмовима за 1. разред средње школе; аутори: мр Љиљана Николић и Босиљка Милић. Завод за уџбенике Београд.)
