= Vukov sabor =

Vukov sabor Вуков сабор
- Logo of Vukov sabor

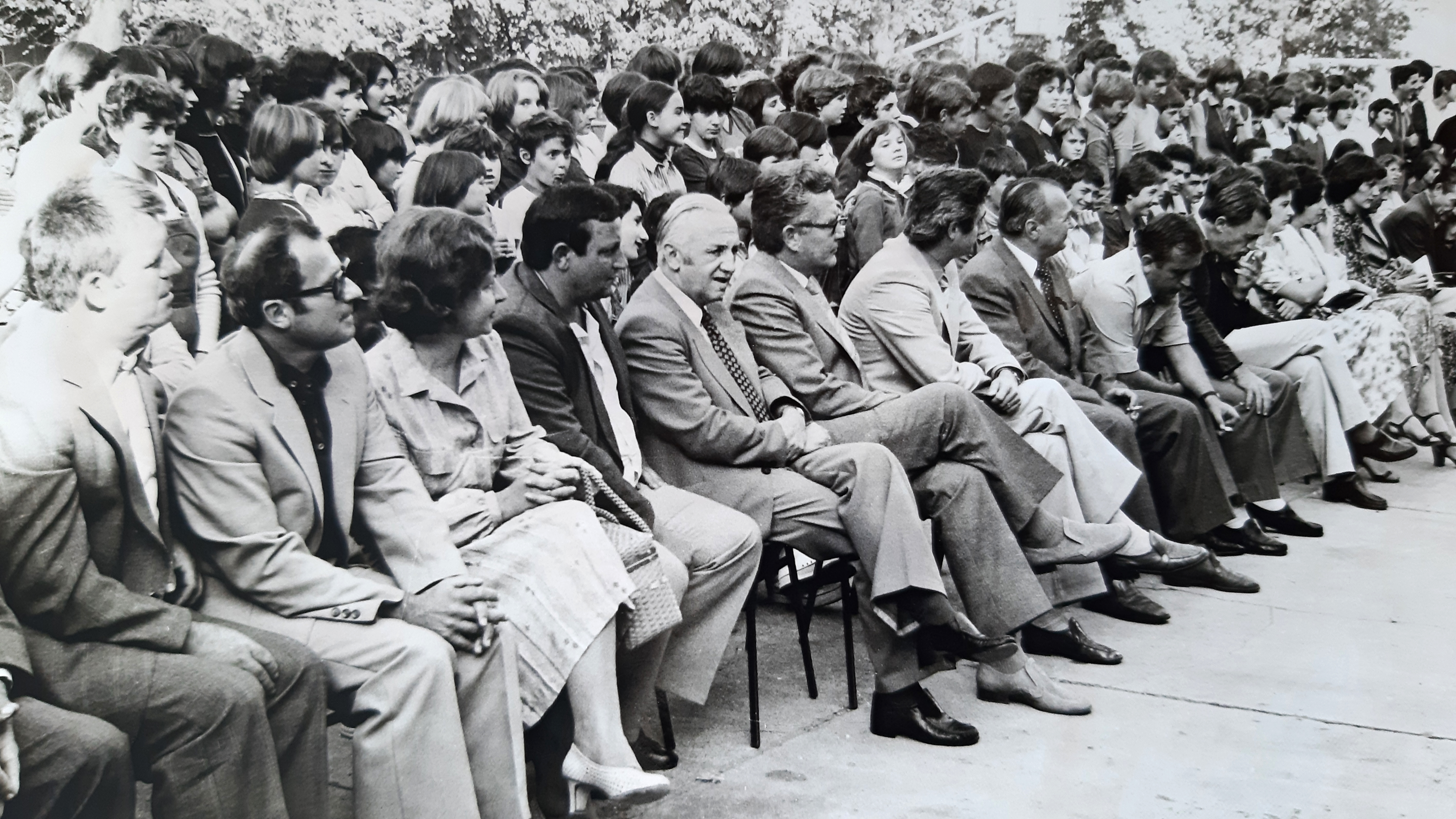
- Vukov sabor (1984)
- Status: Active
- Genre: Cultural event
- Date: A week before the Nativity of Mary
- Frequency: Annually
- Locations: Loznica; Tršić; Tronoša Monastery
- Country: Serbia
- Years active: 1933–Present
- Inaugurated: September 17, 1933; 93 years ago Tršić, Kingdom of Yugoslavia
- Most recent: September 13–19, 2021
- Organizer: Vuk Karadžić Cultural Center; City of Loznica; Ministry of Culture and Information
- Website: ckvkaradzic.org.rs/cir/manifestacijа_vukov_sabor.html

Vukov sabor (Serbian: Вуков сабор, romanized: Vukov sabor), also known as Vuk's Convocation or Vuk's Fair, is the oldest and most massive cultural event in Serbia. It was named after the reformer of the Serbian language Vuk Karadžić. The central program is traditionally held in September in Vuk's birthplace Tršić, near Loznica. Part of the program is realized in Loznica, Belgrade and the nearby Tronoša Monastery.

The manifestation was registered in the National Registrar of Intangible Cultural Heritage of Serbia on June 18, 2012.

== History ==
The first Vukov sabor was held in 1933 and, in following years, Vukov sabor wasn't held only in 1941 and 1944 due to World War II.

#	Year	Dates	Central manifestation orator
1	1933	17 September 1933	
2	1934		
3	1935		
4	1936		
5	1937		
6	1938		
7	1939		
8	1940		
	1941	—N/a	
9	1942		
10	1943		
	1944	—N/a	
75	2008		Radovan Beli Marković
76	2009	September 14–20, 2009	Zoran Hamović
77	2010	September 13–19, 2010	Nebojša Bradić
78	2011	September 12–18, 2011	Angela Richter
79	2012	September 10–16, 2012	Ranko Risojević
80	2013	September 9–15, 2013	Dušan Kovačević
81	2014	September 8–14, 2014	Dragan Stanić
82	2015	September 14–20, 2015	Boško Suvajdžić
83	2016	September 12–18, 2016	Svetislav Božić
84	2017	September 11–17, 2017	Aleksandar Vučić
85	2018	September 10–16, 2018	Veljko Brborić
86	2019	September 9–15, 2019	Emir Kusturica
87	2020	September 14–20, 2020	Janko Vujinović
88	2021	September 13–19, 2021	Aleksandar Milanović

== Organizers ==
Organizers of Vukov sabor are Vuk Karadžić Cultural Center, the city of Loznica, and Serbian Ministry of Culture and Information.
