= Tršić =

Tršić Тршић (Serbian)
- Village (Selo)
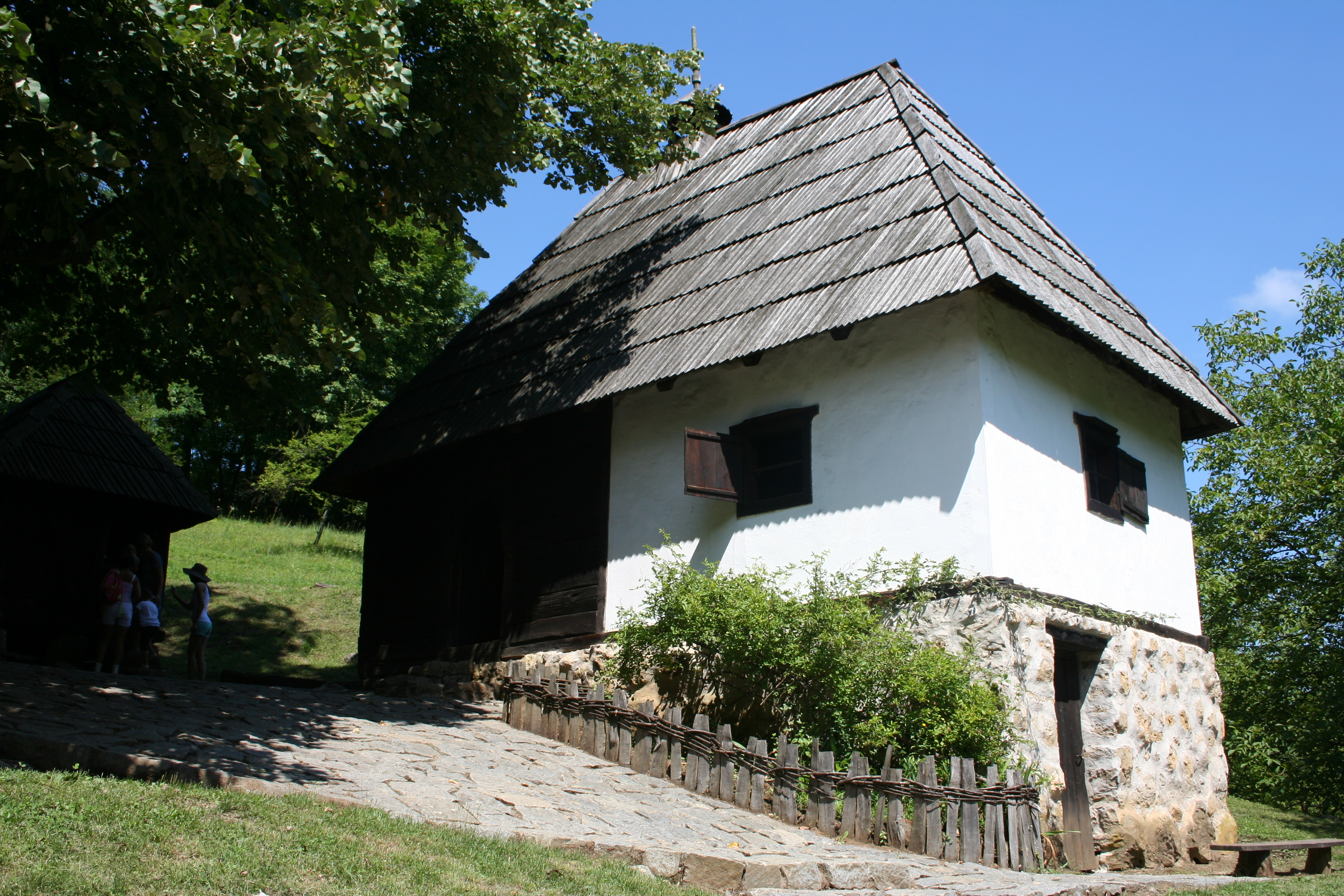
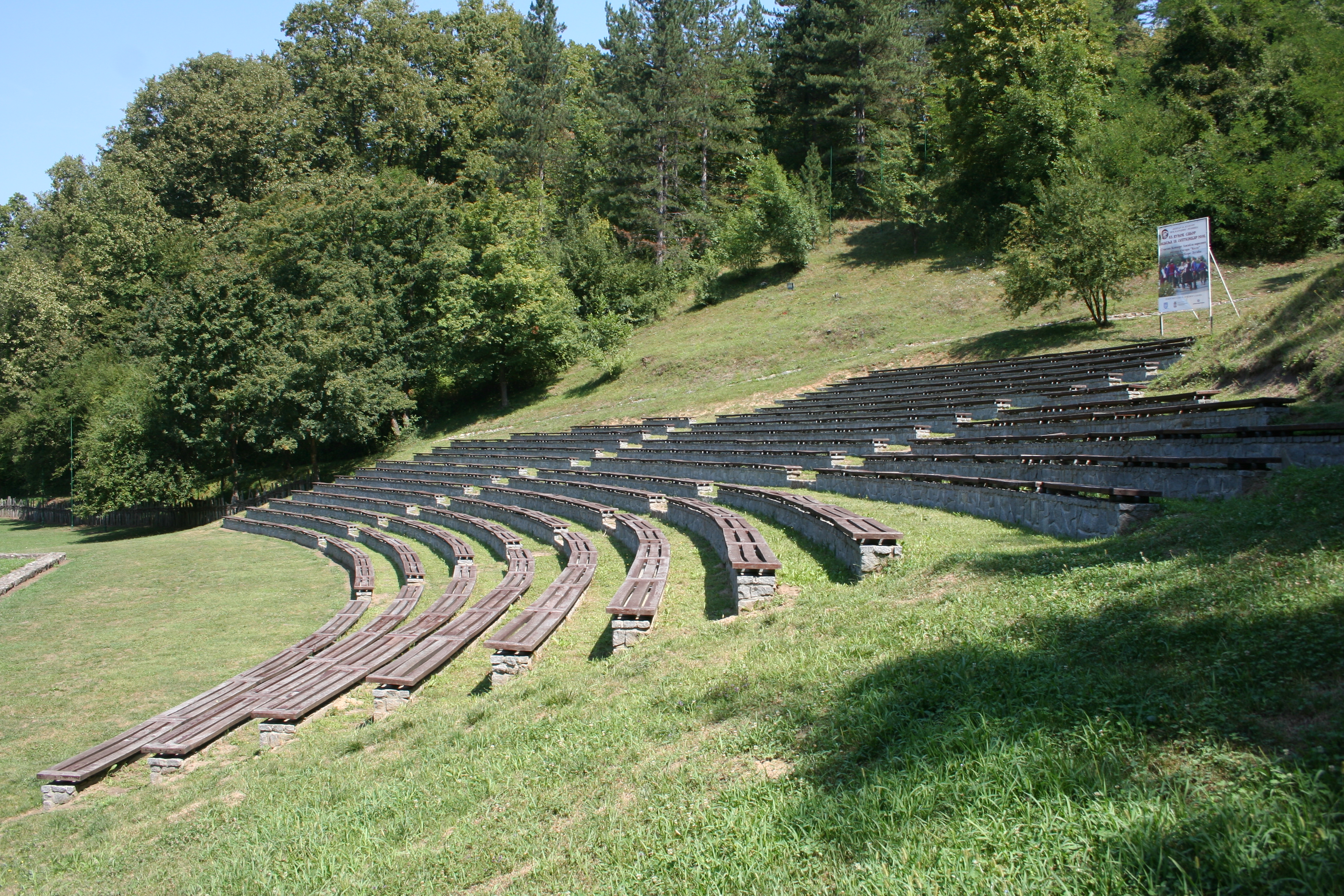
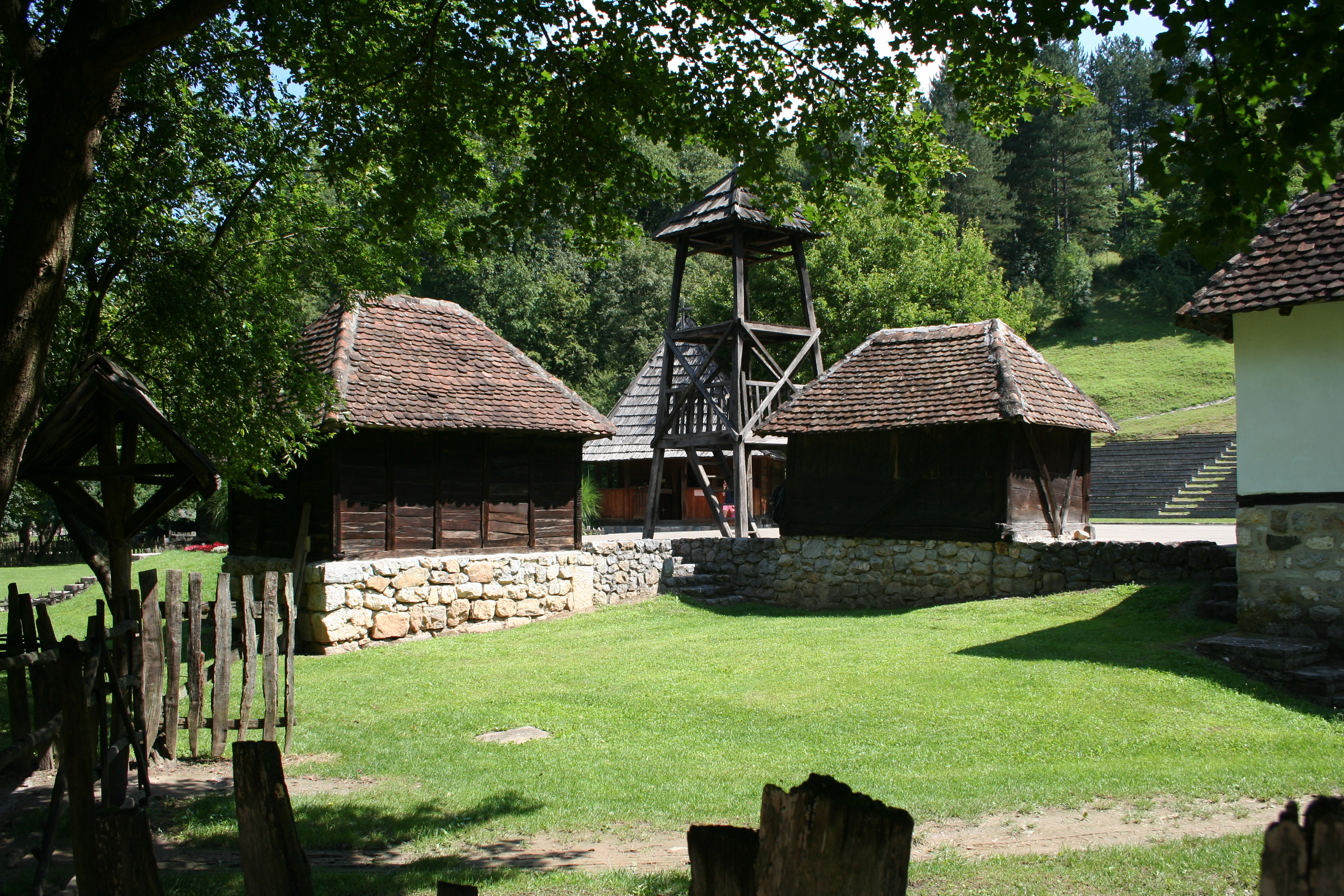
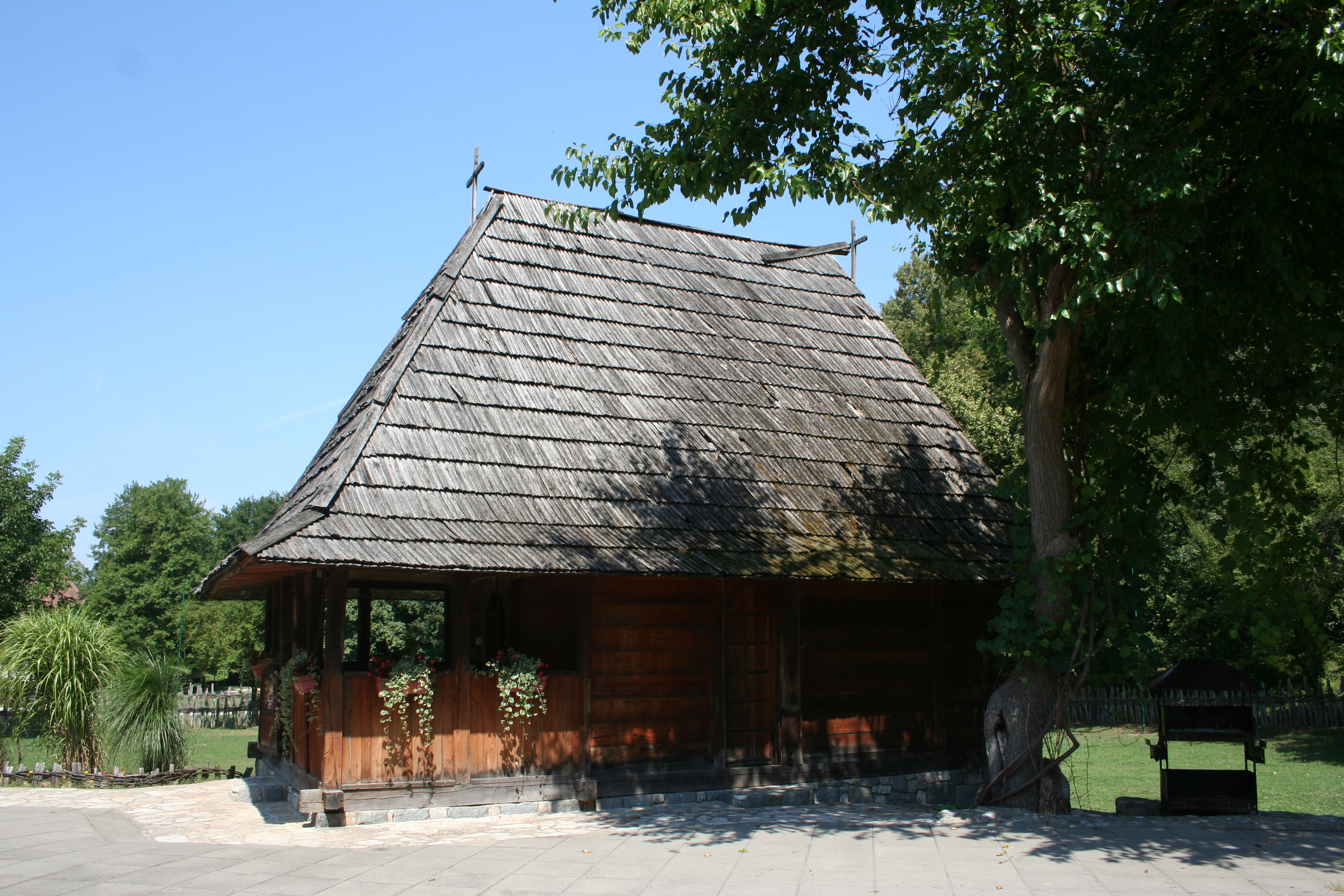
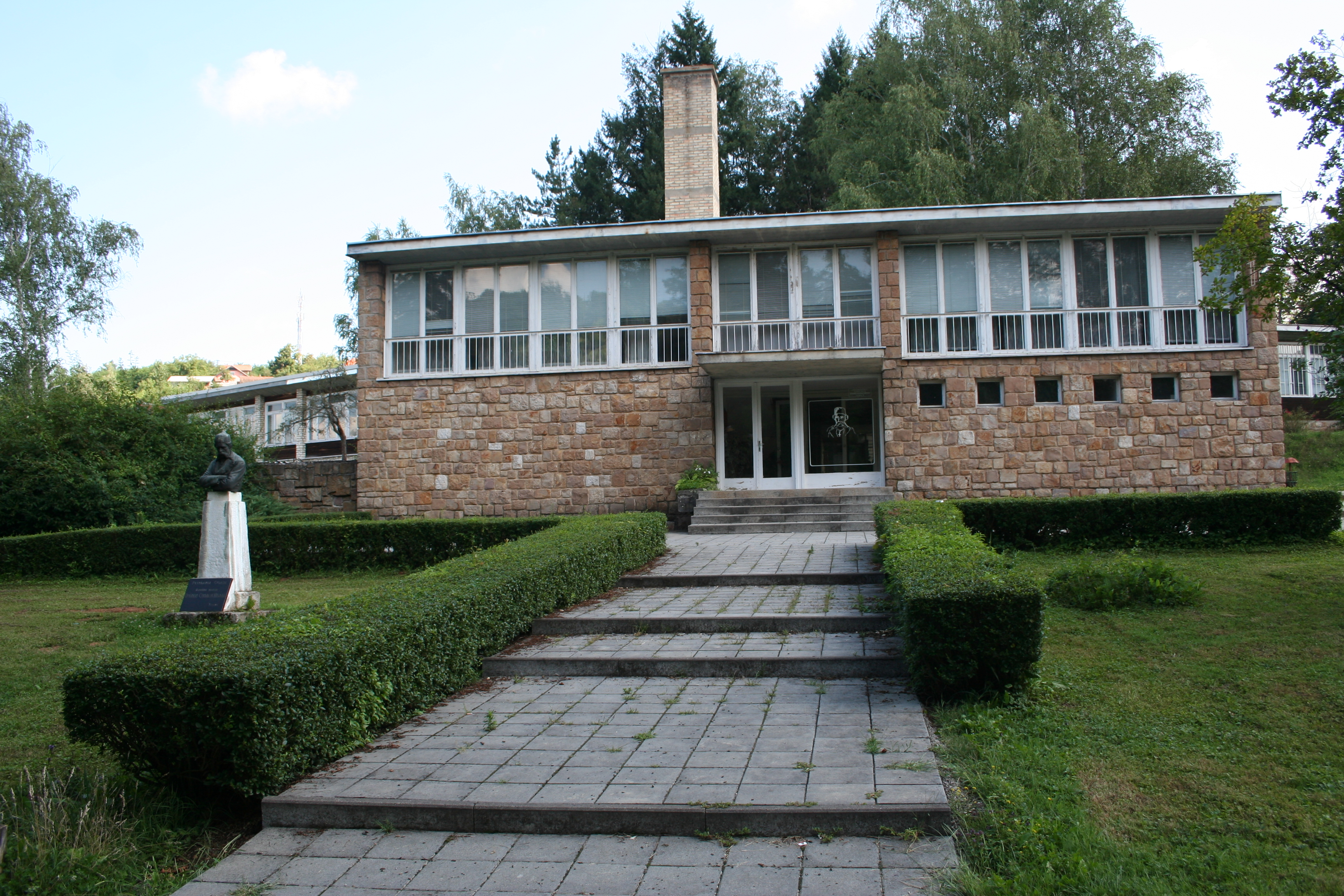
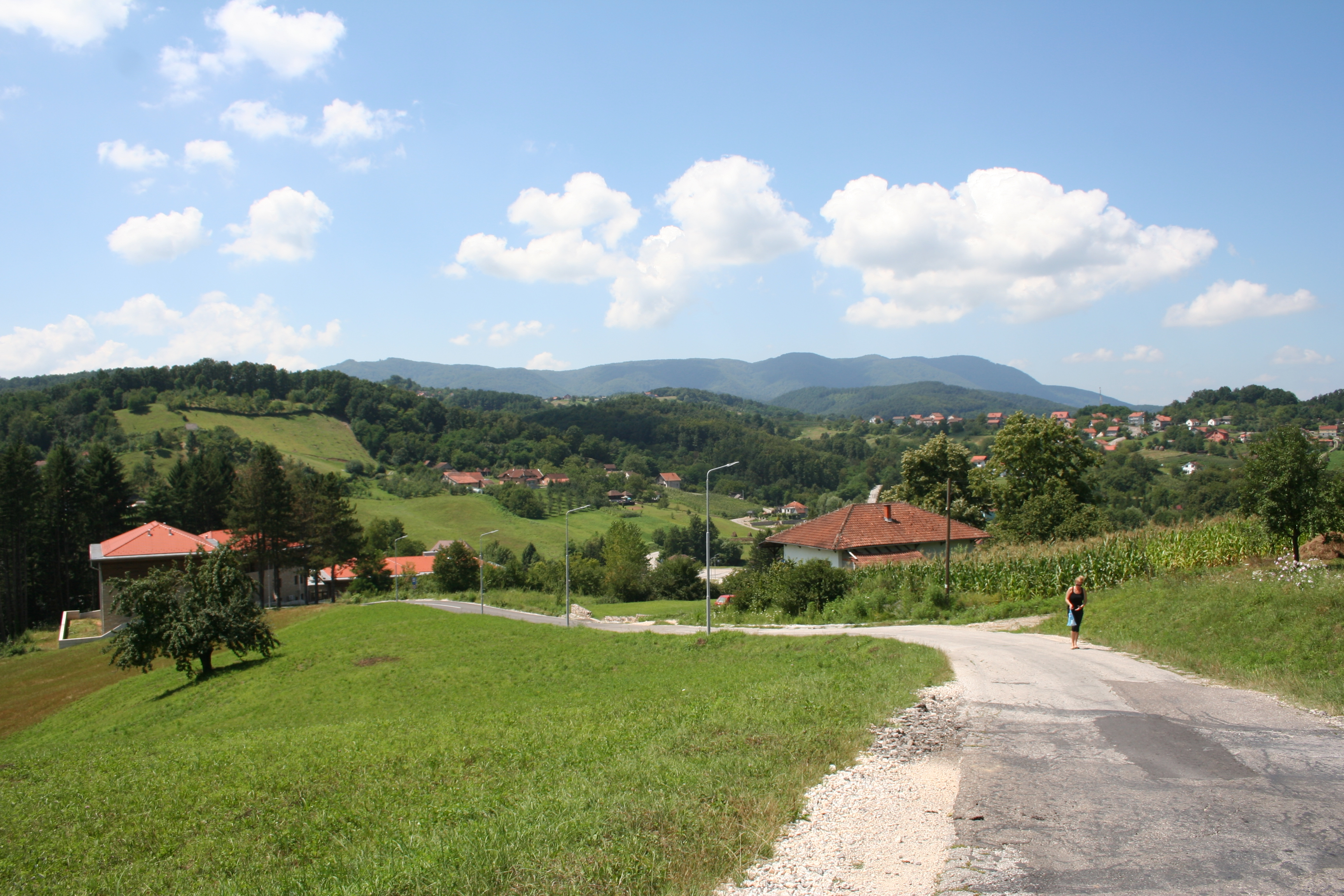
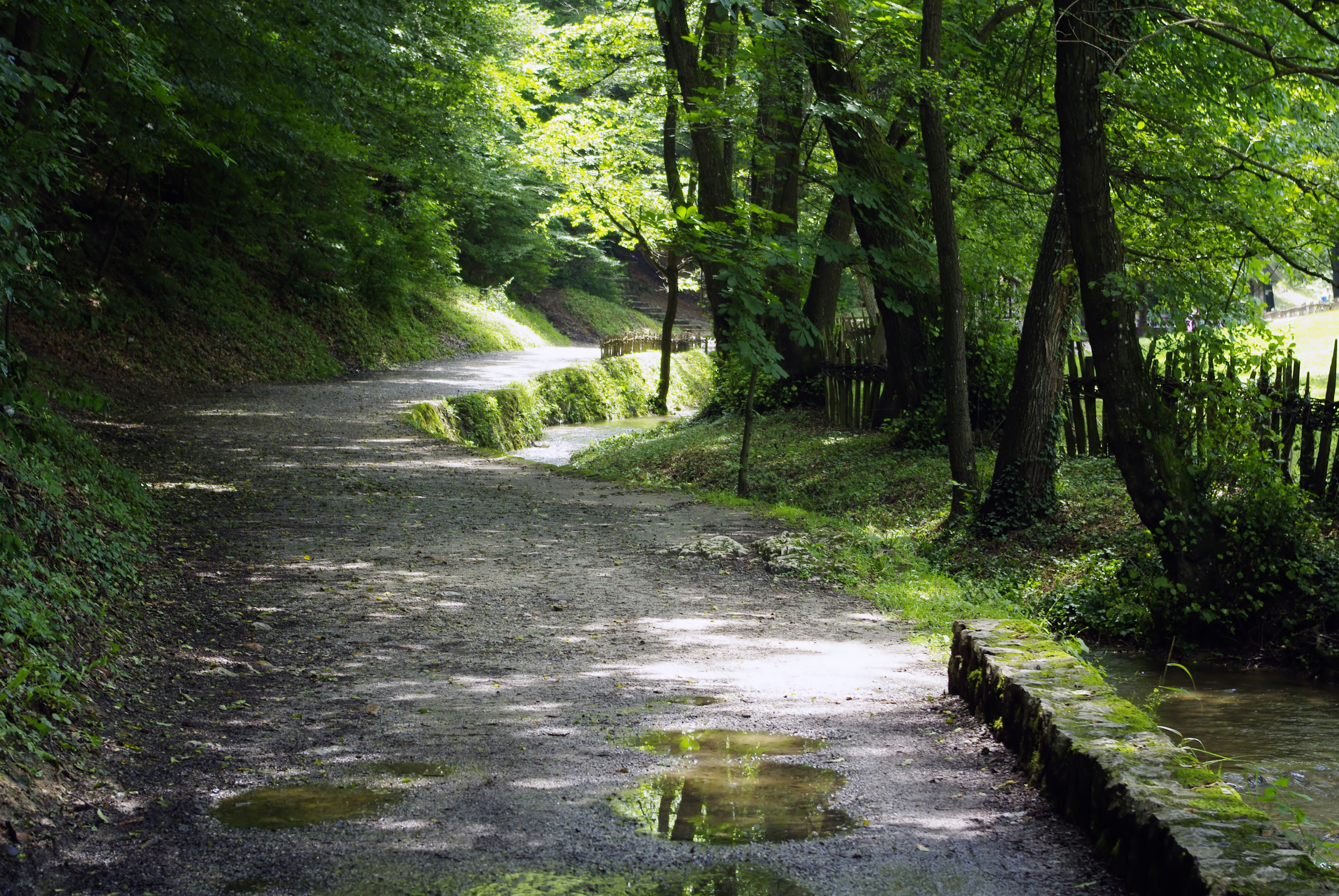
- Interactive map of Tršić
- Coordinates (mountain): 44.5081°N 19.2689°E
- Country: Serbia
- Statistical region: Šumadija and Western Serbia
- District: Mačva District
- Municipality: Loznica
- Elevation: 233 m (764 ft)

Population (2022)
  - Total: 1,124
- Time zone: +1
- Postal code: 15303
- Area code: 015

Tršić (Serbian Cyrillic: Тршић, pronounced [tr̩̂ʃitɕ]) is a village in the municipality of Loznica, located in the Mačva region of Serbia. According to the 2022 census, it has a population of 1,124 people.

It is the birthplace of Serbian linguist and language reformer, Vuk Stefanović Karadžić. Most houses in the area are built out of wood.

The village was destroyed by Ottoman forces during the Serbian Revolution, but was repaired and transformed into a museum to Karadžić.

Tršić's closest settlement to it is Vukanovac.

== House of Vuk ==
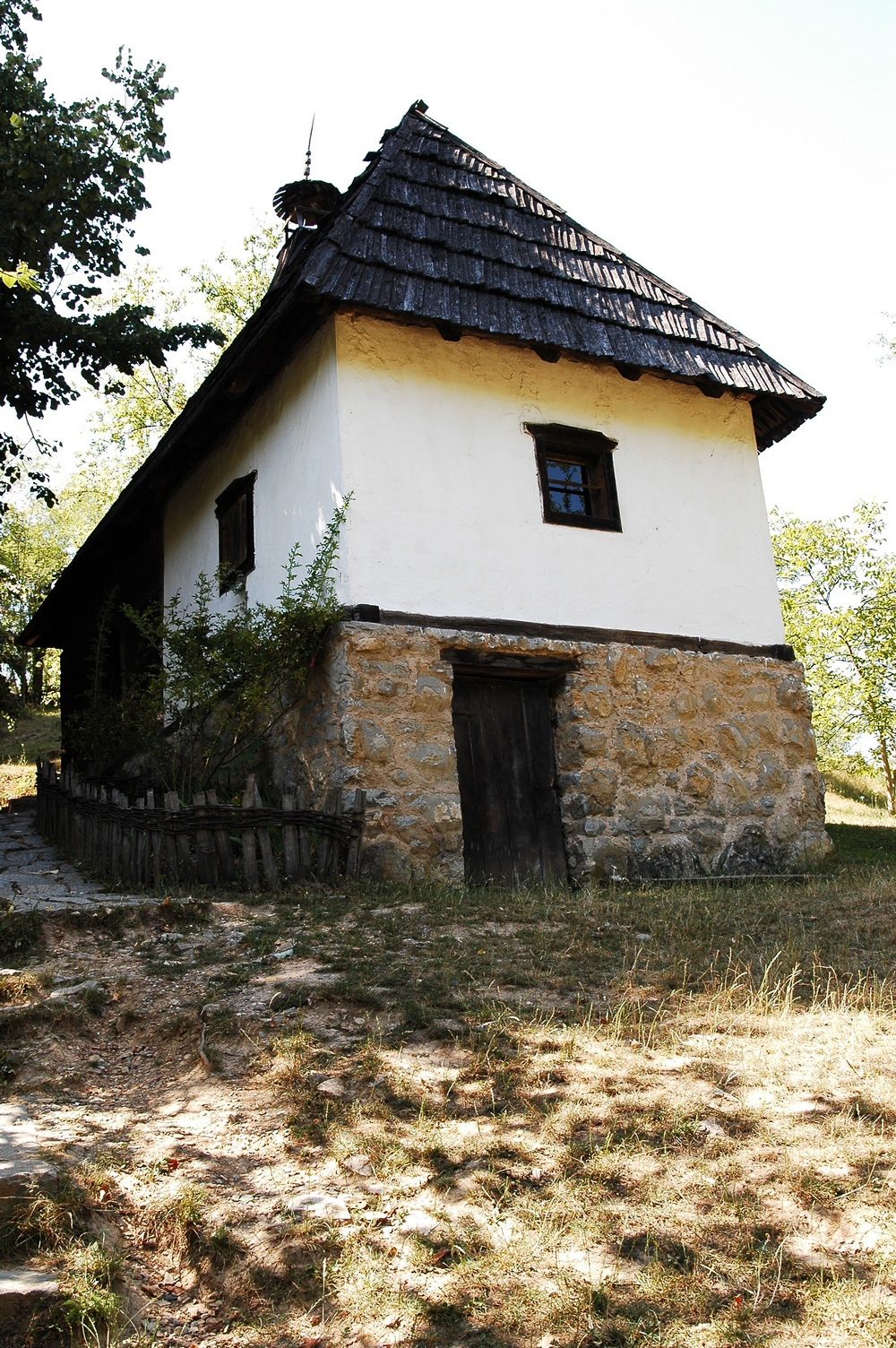
House of Vuk

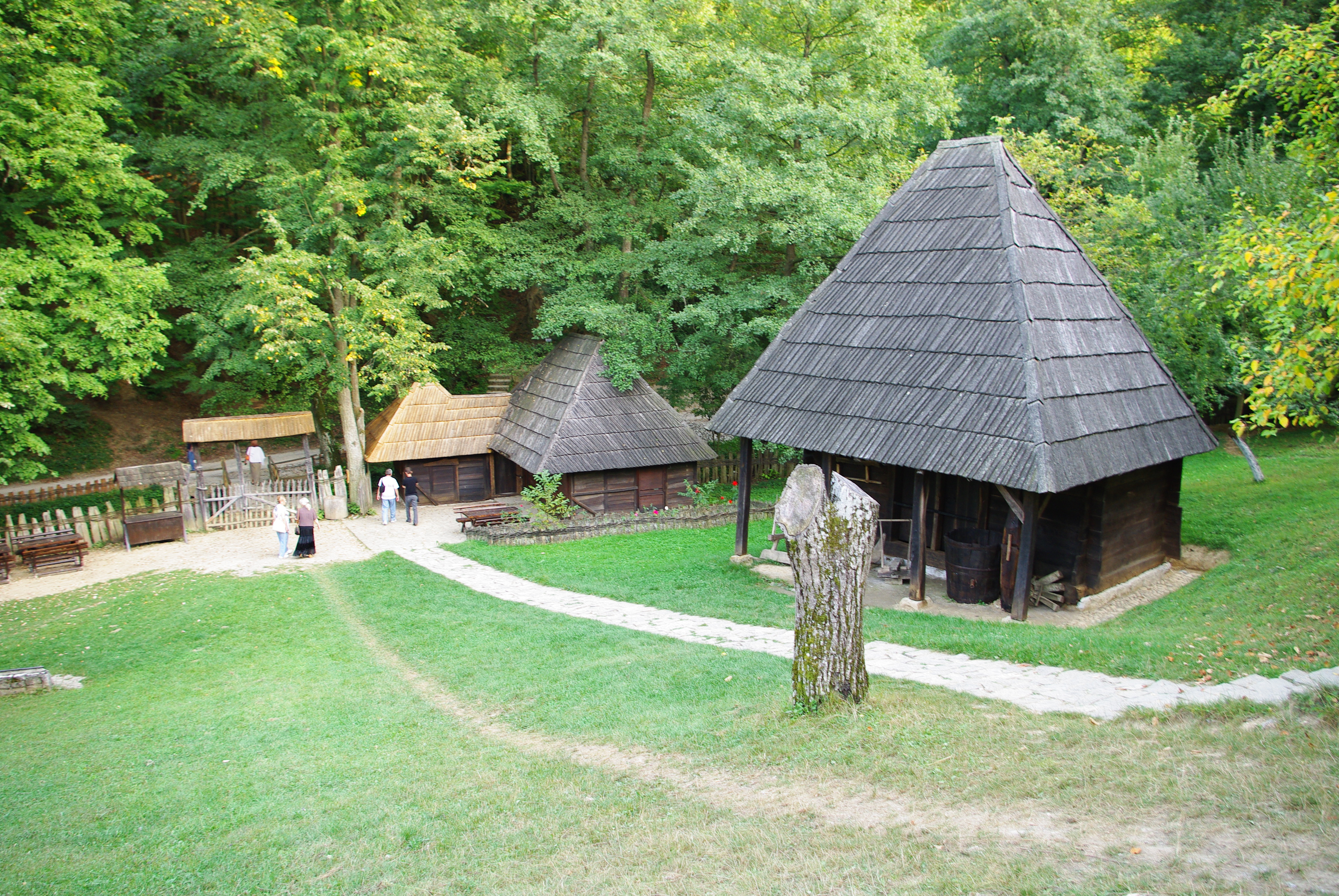
Courtyard in front of the Vuk Karadžić's house

When making the ethno-park, attention was paid to the desire to permanently mark and preserve the memories of Vuk and his work, and to preserve the natural environment and spatial values. In 1933, at the place where Vuk Karadžić's family home was, the memorial house was built: a two-piece log cabin and part of the basement, covered in a steep roof. One part of the chalets are a house and room, and another warehouse, kačara and corn-store. The house is a department with an open fireplace, furniture and dishes, characteristic of the houses from the 19th century. The room contains a bed, table, bench, icons, gusle, and Vuk's portrait from the 1816, by Pavel Đurković.

On the occasion of 100 years of the death of Vuk (in 1964) student work brigades raised an amphitheater with a stage that was needed for organizing Vuk's Council and Vuk's Student Council. In 1987, Tršić received a comprehensive look as a cultural-historical and monumental center. Also, the road from Vuk's home to Tronoša monastery was built.

Vuk's birth house was declared Monument of Culture of Exceptional Importance in 1979, and it is protected by Republic of Serbia.

== Vukov Sabor ==
Vukov Sabor cultural event was established in Tršić on the day of the opening of the renovated House of Vuk, September 17, 1933. Since then it has been held annually in September (except in 1941 and 1944, due to World War II). It is the largest cultural event in Serbia, for its importance and volume (20-30,000 visitors).

== Gallery ==
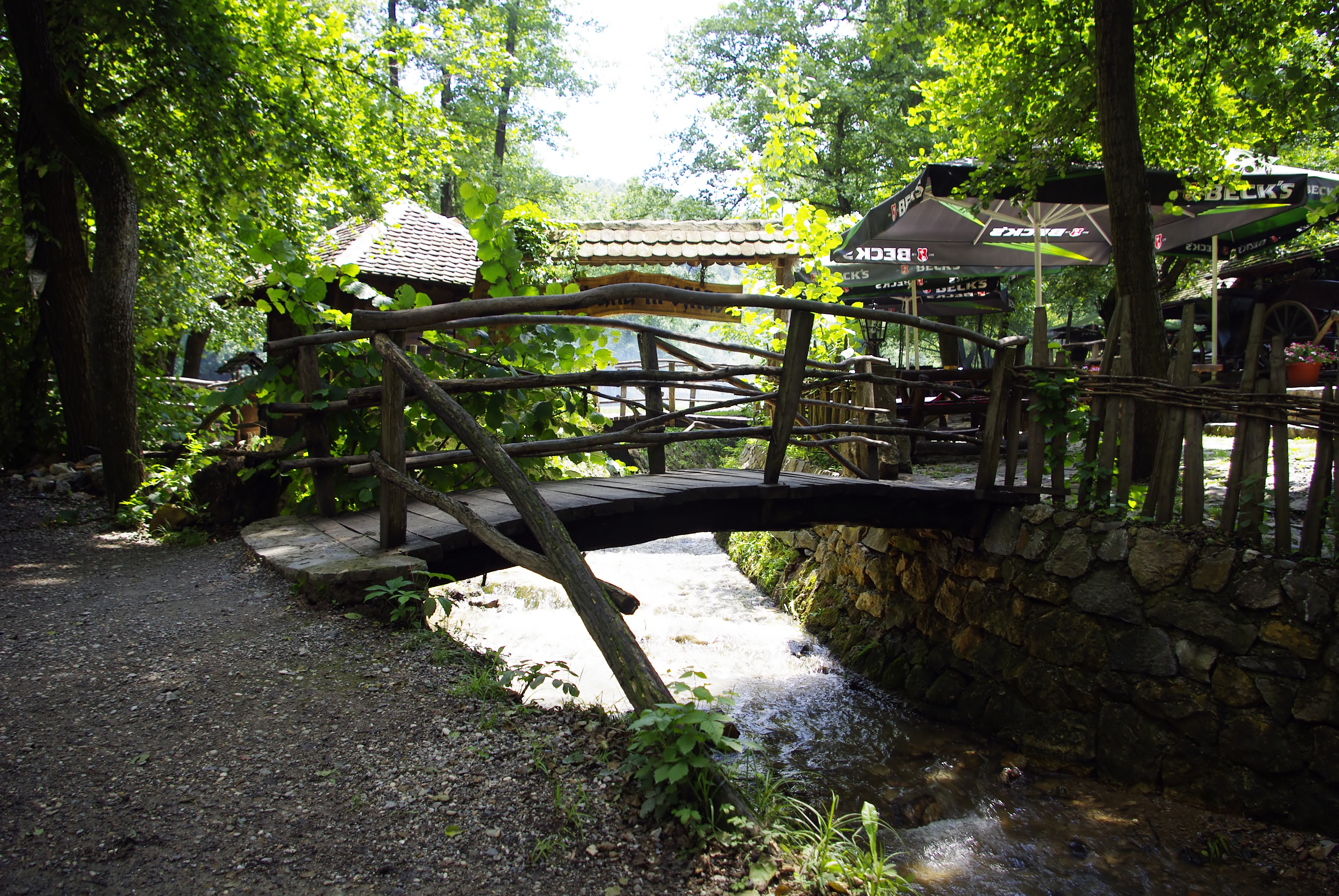

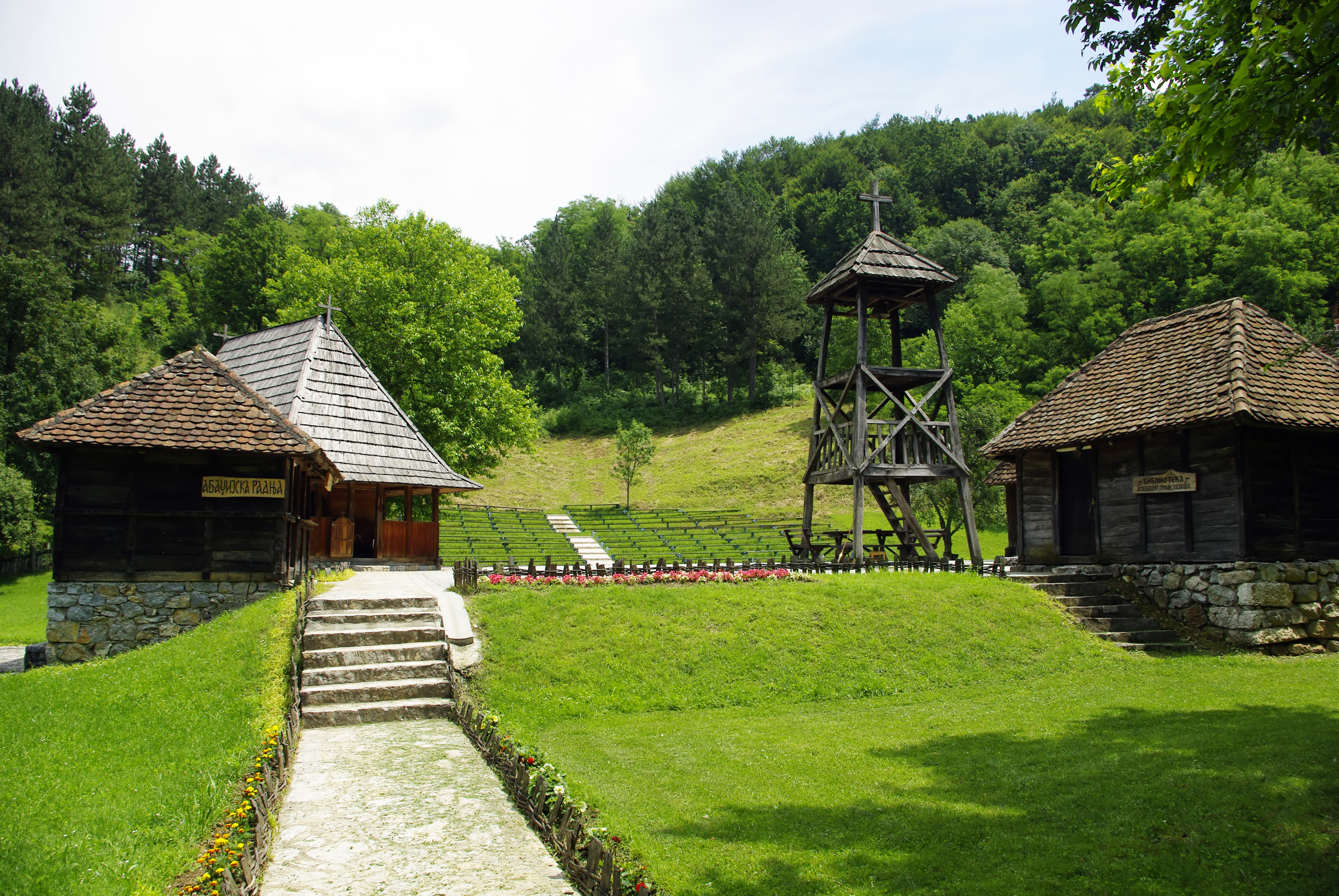

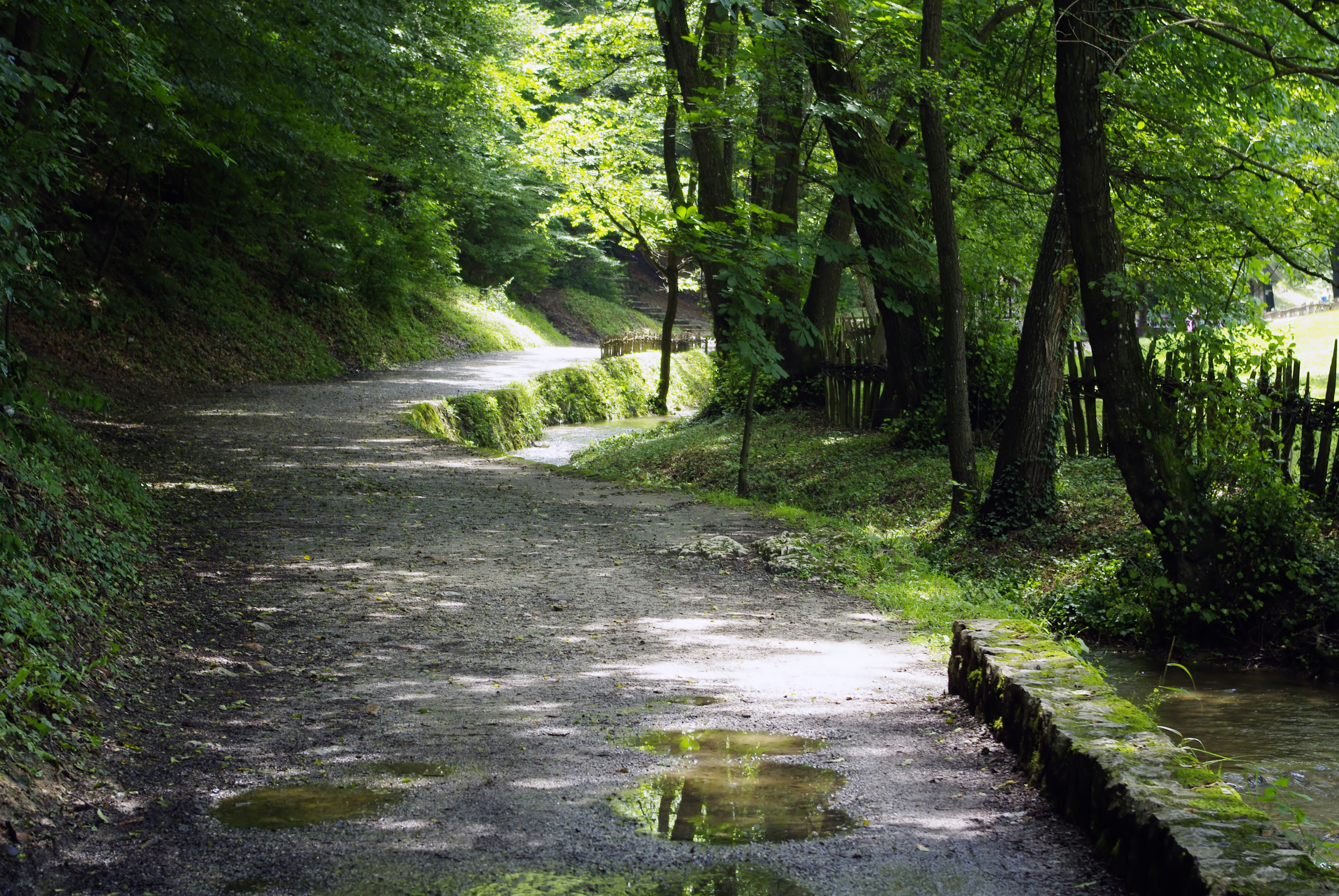

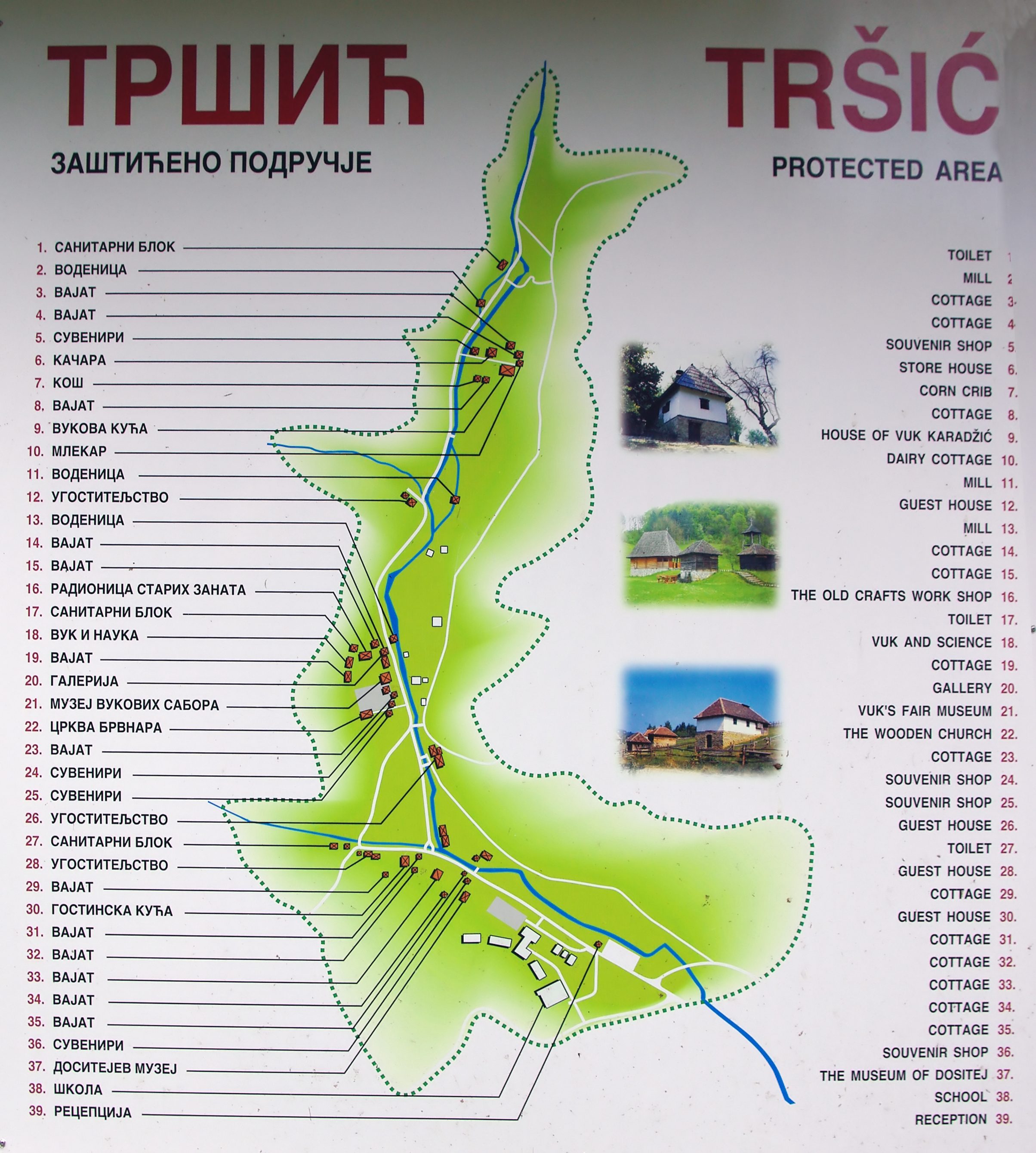

== See also ==
- Monument of Culture of Exceptional Importance
- Tourism in Serbia
- Vuk Stefanović Karadžić
