= Vuk Karadžić =

Serbian philologist and linguist (1787–1864)

- Вук Стефановић Караџић
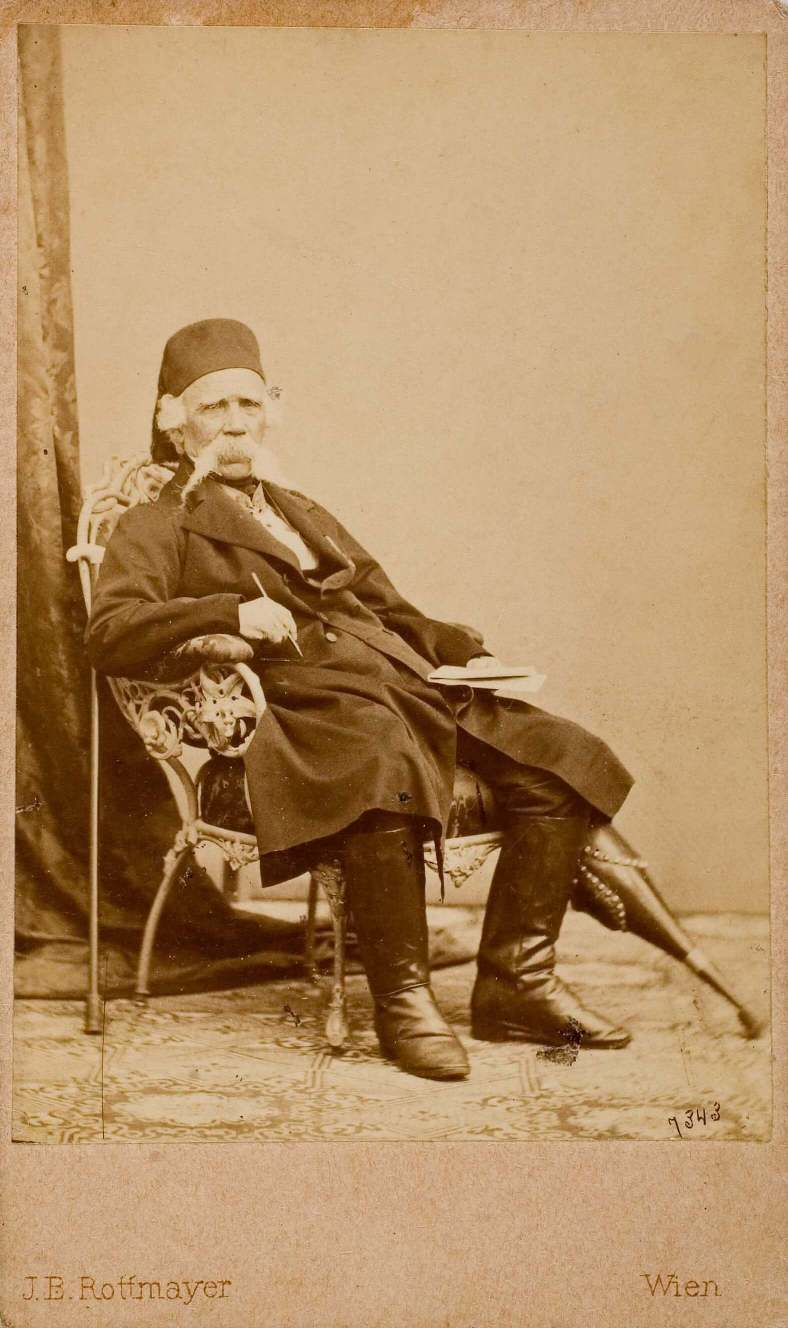
- Vuk Stefanović Karadžić
- Born: Vuk Stefanović Karadžić; 6 November 1787; Tršić, Loznica Kaza, Sanjak of Zvornik, Ottoman Empire
- Died: 7 February 1864 (aged 76); Vienna, Austrian Empire
- Resting place: Cathedral of Saint Archangel Michael, Belgrade, Serbia
- Citizenship: Ottoman, Serbian, Austrian
- Education: Belgrade Higher School
- Occupations: Philologist, linguist
- Era: 19th century
- Known for: Serbian language reform Serbian Cyrillic alphabet
- Movement: Serbian Revival
- Spouse: Anna Maria Kraus
- Children: inter alia, Mina Karadžić

Vuk Stefanović Karadžić (Serbian Cyrillic: Вук Стефановић Караџић, pronounced [vûːk stefǎːnovitɕ kâradʒitɕ]; 6 November 1787 (26 October OS) – 7 February 1864) was a Serbian philologist, anthropologist and linguist. He was one of the most important reformers of the modern Serbian language. Vuk Karadžić was a versatile scholar and the founder of several Serbian academic disciplines, with a significant contribution to historiography. For his collection and preservation of Serbian folktales, Encyclopædia Britannica labelled Karadžić "the father of Serbian folk-literature scholarship." He was also the author of the first Serbian dictionary in the new reformed language. In addition, he translated the New Testament into the reformed form of the Serbian spelling and language.

He was well known abroad and familiar to Jacob Grimm, Johann Wolfgang von Goethe and historian Leopold von Ranke. Karadžić was the primary source for Ranke's Die serbische Revolution ("The Serbian Revolution"), written in 1829.

== Biography ==
=== Early life ===
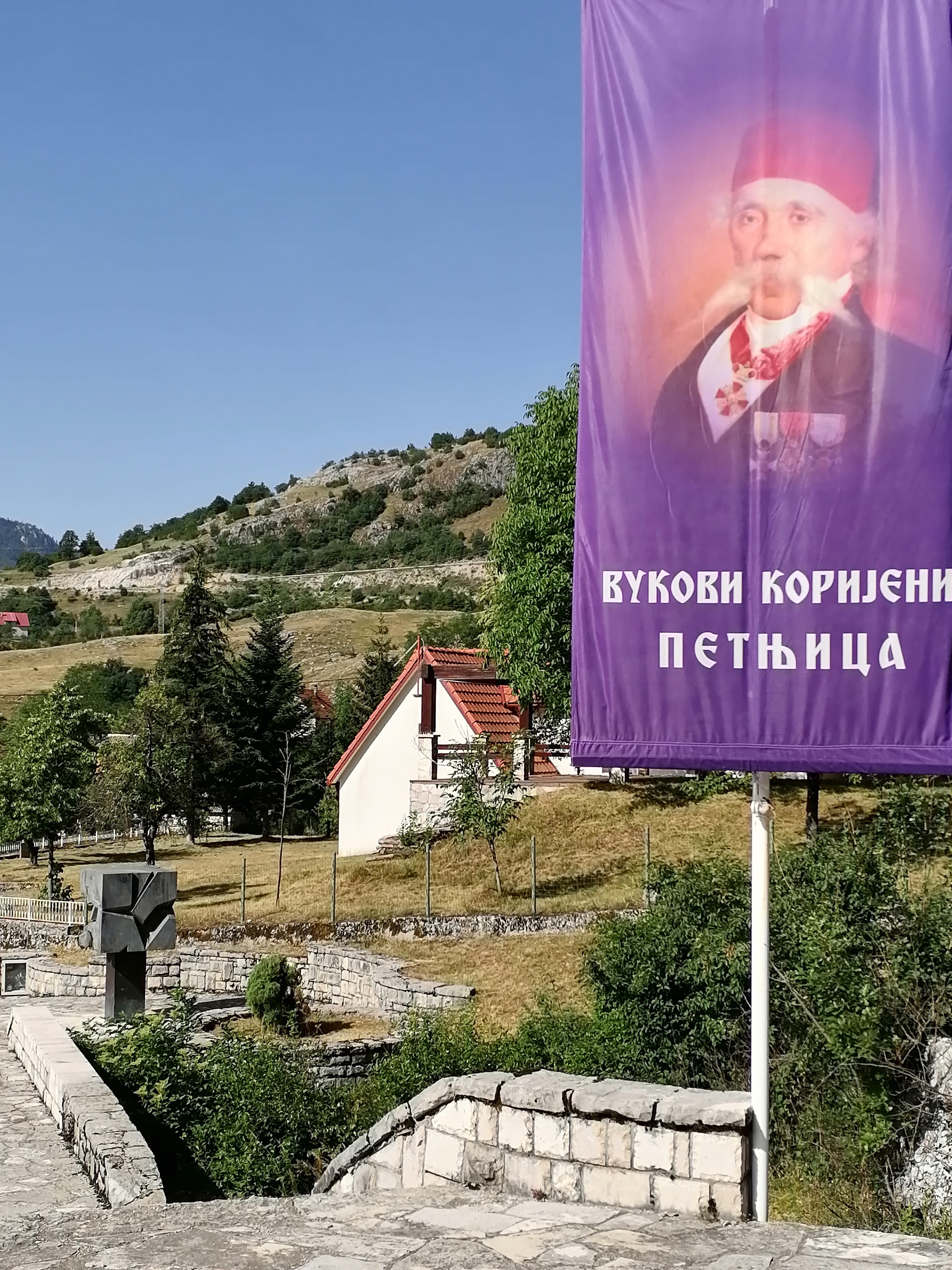
Petnjica, Šavnik

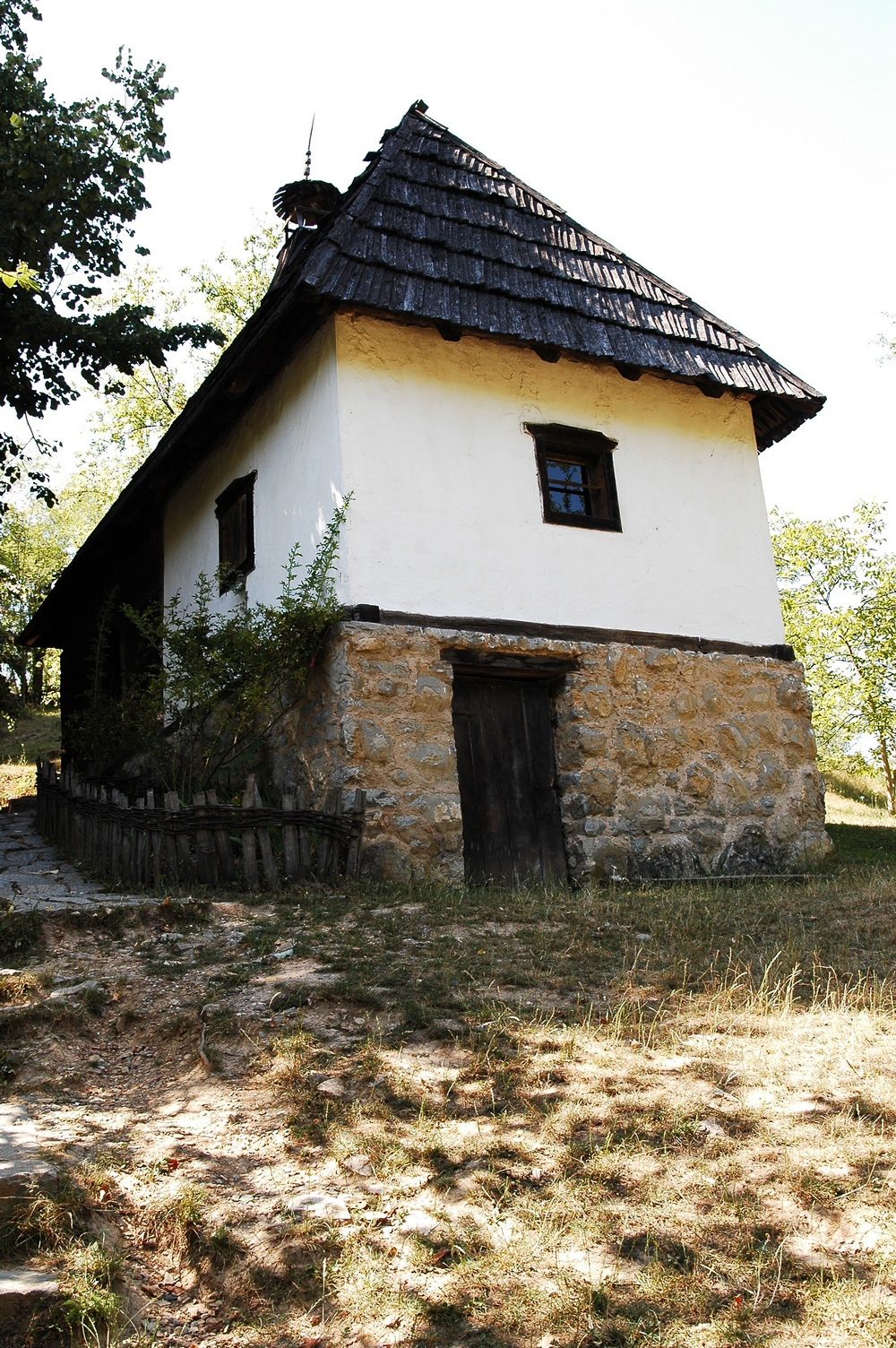
Vuk Karadžić's house today in the all-museum village Tršić.

Karadžić was born to Serbian parents Stefan and Jegda (née Zrnić) in the village of Tršić, near Loznica, then a part of the Ottoman Empire. His family settled from Drobnjaci (Petnjica, Šavnik), and his mother was born in Ozrinići, Nikšić, (in present-day Montenegro). His family had a low infant survival rate, thus he was named Vuk ('wolf') so that witches and evil spirits would not hurt him (the name was traditionally given to strengthen the bearer).

=== Education ===
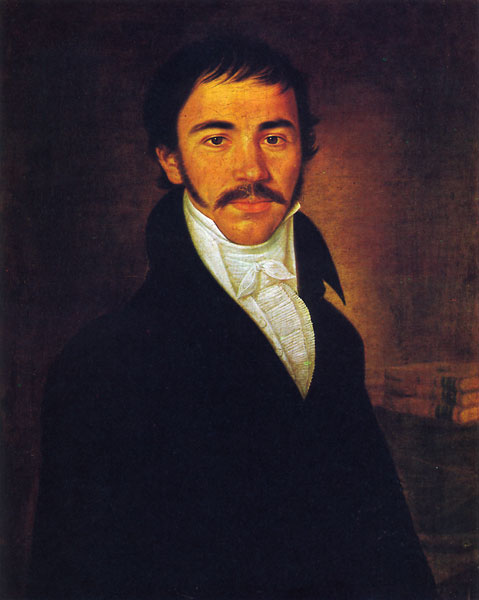
Oil painting by Pavel Đurković, dating to 1816 (age 29)

Karadžić was fortunate to be a relative of Jevta Čotrić, the only literate person in the area at the time, who taught him how to read and write. Karadžić continued his education in the Tronoša Monastery in Loznica, where Stefan Tronoški served as archimandrite. As a boy he learned calligraphy there, using a reed instead of a pen and a solution of gunpowder for ink. In lieu of proper writing paper, he was lucky if he could get cartridge wrappings. Throughout the whole region, regular schooling was not widespread at that time and his father at first did not allow him to go to Austria. Since most of the time, while in the monastery Karadžić was forced to pasture the livestock instead of studying, his father brought him back home. Meanwhile, the First Serbian Uprising seeking to overthrow the Ottomans began in 1804. After unsuccessful attempts to enroll in the gymnasium at Sremski Karlovci, for which 19-year-old Karadžić was too old, he left for Petrinja where he spent a few months learning Latin and German. Later on, he met highly respected scholar Dositej Obradović in Belgrade, which was now in the hands of the Revolutionary Serbia, to ask Obradović to support his studies. Obradović dismissed him. Disappointed, Karadžić left for Jadar and began working as a scribe for Jakov Nenadović and sometime later for Jevta Savić Čotrić as a customs officer, all during the uprising (1804–1813). After the founding of Belgrade's Great School, Karadžić became one of its students.

=== Later life and death ===
Soon afterwards, he grew ill and left for medical treatment in Pest and Novi Sad, but was unable to receive treatment for his leg. It was rumored that Karadžić deliberately refused to undergo amputation, instead deciding to make do with a prosthetic wooden pegleg, of which there were several sarcastic references in some of his works. Karadžić returned to Serbia by 1810, and as unfit for military service, he served as the secretary for commanders Ćurčija and Hajduk Veljko. His experiences would later give rise to two books. With the Ottoman defeat of the Serbian rebels in 1813, he left for Vienna and later met Jernej Kopitar, an experienced linguist with a strong interest in secular Slavistics. Kopitar's influence helped Karadžić with his struggle in reforming the Serbian language and its orthography. Another important influence on his linguistic work was Sava Mrkalj.

In 1814 and 1815, Karadžić published two volumes of Serbian Folk Songs, which afterwards increased to four, then to six, and finally to nine tomes. In enlarged editions, these admirable songs drew towards themselves the attention of all literary Europe and America. Goethe characterized some of them as "excellent and worthy of comparison with Solomon's Song of Songs."

In 1824, he sent a copy of his folksong collection to Jacob Grimm, who was enthralled particularly by "The Building of Skadar" which Karadžić recorded from singing of Old Rashko. Grimm translated it into German and the song was noted and admired for many generations to come. Grimm compared them with the noblest flowers of Homeric poetry, and of The Building of Skadar he said: "one of the most touching poems of all nations and all times." The founders of the Romantic School in France, Charles Nodier, Prosper Mérimée, Lamartine, Gérard de Nerval, and Claude Fauriel translated a goodly number of them, and they also attracted the attention of Russian Alexander Pushkin, Finnish national poet Johan Ludvig Runeberg, Czech Samuel Roznay, Pole Kazimierz Brodziński, English writers Walter Scott, Owen Meredith, and John Bowring, among others.

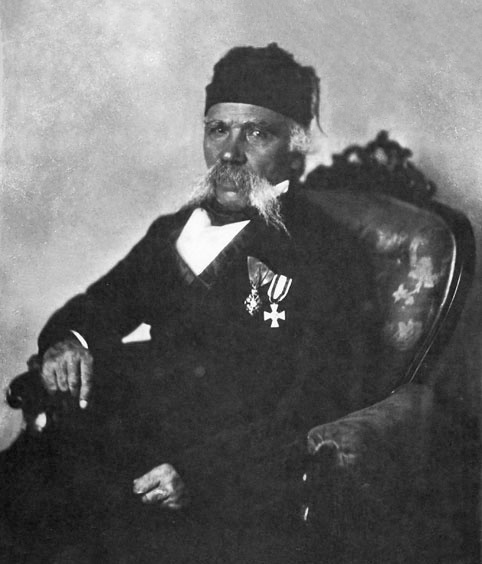
Vuk Karadžić in 1850.

Karadžić continued collecting songs well into the 1830s. He arrived in Montenegro in the fall of 1834. Infirm, he descended to the Bay of Kotor to winter there, and returned in the spring of 1835. It was there that Karadžić met Vuk Vrčević, an aspiring littérateur, born in Risan. From then on, Vrčević became Karadžić's faithful and loyal collaborator who collected folk songs and tales and sent them to his address in Vienna for many years to come. Another equally diligent collaborator of Vuk Karadžić was another namesake from Boka Kotorska the Priest Vuk Popović. Both Vrčević and Popović were steadily and unselfishly involved in the gathering of the ethnographic, folklore and lexical material for Karadžić. Later, other collaborators joined Karadžić, including Milan Milićević.

The majority of Karadžić's works were banned from publishing in Serbia and Austria during the rule of Prince Miloš Obrenović. As observed from a political point of view, Obrenović saw the works of Karadžić as a potential hazard due to a number of apparent reasons, one of which was the possibility that the content of some of the works, although purely poetic in nature, was capable of creating a certain sense of patriotism and a desire for freedom and independence, which very likely might have driven the populace to take up arms against the Turks. This, in turn, would prove detrimental to Prince Miloš's politics toward the Ottoman Empire, with whom he had recently forged an uneasy peace. In Montenegro, however, Njegoš's printing press operated without the archaic letter known as the "hard sign". Prince Miloš was to resent Njegoš's abandonment of the hard sign, over which, at that time, furious intellectual battles were being waged, with ecclesiastical hierarchy involved as well. Karadžić's works, however, did receive high praise and recognition elsewhere, especially in Russian Empire. In addition to this, Karadžić was granted a full pension from the Emperor of All Russia in 1826.

He was married to Ana Maria Kraus from 1818 until the end of his life. They had 13 children together, but only two of them outlived the parents.

Vuk Karadžic died in 1864 in Vienna. He was survived by his wife, by his daughter Mina Karadžić, who was a painter and writer, and by his son Dimitrije Karadžić, a military officer. His remains were relocated to Belgrade in 1897 and buried with great honours next to the grave of Dositej Obradović, in front of St. Michael's Cathedral (Belgrade).

== Work ==
=== Linguistic reforms ===
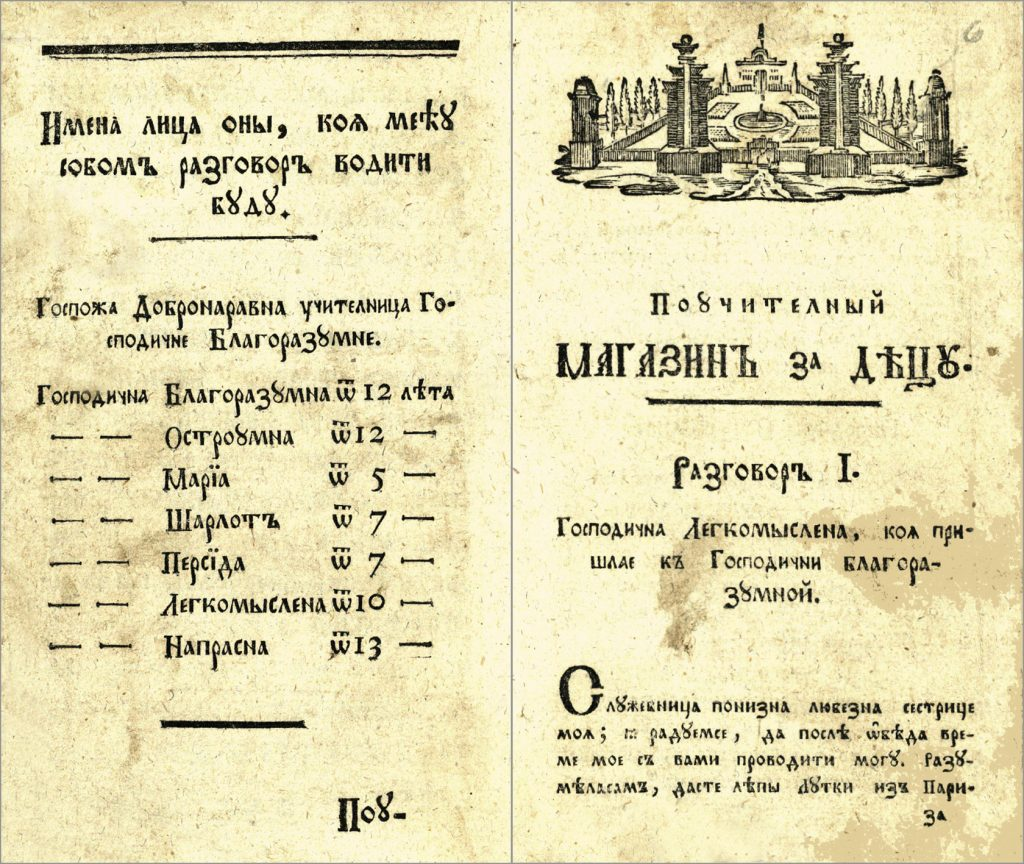
Example of pre-reform spelling in a school book from 1787.

During the latter part of the eighteenth- and the beginning of the nineteenth century, most nations in Western and Eastern Europe underwent a period of language reforms with Germany's Johann Christoph Gottsched and Johann Christoph Adelung, Norway's Aasmund Olavsson Vinje, Ivar Aasen, and Knud Knudsen, Sweden's Carl Gustaf af Leopold, Italy's Alessandro Manzoni, Spain's Andrés Bello, Greece's Adamantios Korais, Russia's Yakov Grot and others.

At about the same period, Vuk Karadžić reformed the Serbian literary language and standardized the Serbian Cyrillic alphabet by following strict phonemic principles on the Johann Christoph Adelung' model and Jan Hus' Czech alphabet. Karadžić's reforms of the Serbian literary language modernized it and distanced it from Serbian and Russian Church Slavonic and brought it closer to common folk speech. For example, Karadžić discarded earlier signs and letters that had no match in common Serbian speech, and he introduced 6 Cyrillic letters to make writing the Serbian language simpler. Karadžić also translated the New Testament into Serbian, which was published in 1847.

Because the Slavonic-Serbian written language of the early 19th century contained many words connected to the Orthodox church and a large number of loanwords from Russian Church Slavonic, Karadžić proposed to abandon this written language and to create a new one, based on the Eastern Herzegovina dialect which he spoke. Some Serbian clergy and other linguists opposed him, for example, the Serbian clergy with a base in the area around modern Novi Sad, who viewed the grammar and vocabulary of the Eastern Herzegovinian dialect as almost a foreign tongue that was unacceptable as a basis for a modern language. But Karadžić successfully insisted that his linguistic standard was closer to popular speech and could be understood and written by more people. He called his dialect Herzegovinian because, as he wrote, "Serbian is spoken most purely and correctly in Herzegovina and in Bosnia." Karadžić never visited those lands, but his family roots and speech came from Herzegovina. Ultimately, Vuk Karadžić's ideas and linguistic standard won against his clerical and scientific opponents. Karadžić was, together with Đuro Daničić, the main Serbian signatory to the Vienna Literary Agreement of 1850, which, encouraged by Austrian authorities, laid the foundation for the Serbo-Croatian language; Karadžić himself only ever referred to the language as "Serbian".

The Vukovian effort of language standardization lasted the remainder of the century. Before then the Serbs had achieved a fully independent state (1878), and a flourishing national culture based in Belgrade and Novi Sad. Despite the Vienna agreement, the Serbs had by this time developed an Ekavian pronunciation, which was the native speech of their two cultural capitals as well as the great majority of the Serbian population. Vuk Karadžić greatly influenced South Slavic linguists across Southeast Europe. Serbian journals in Austria-Hungary and in Serbia proper began to use his linguistic standard. In Croatia, the linguist Tomislav Maretić acknowledged Karadžić's work as foundational to his codification of Croatian grammar.

Karadžić held the view that all South Slavs that speak the Shtokavian dialect were Serbs or of Serbian origin, and considered all of them to speak the Serbian language (for consequences of such idea see Greater Serbia#Vuk Karadžić's Pan-Serbism), which was by then and still is today disputed by linguists and historians (see Ethnic affiliation of native speakers of Shtokavian dialect). He personally considered Serbs to be of three different creeds (Serbian: zakona), specifically of the Orthodox, Catholic, and Mohammedan, citing general similarities in local traditions that only differed because of the local religion and, in the case of Catholicism and Islam, foreign influences. However, Karadžić wrote later that he gave up this view because he saw that the Croats of his time did not agree with it, and he switched to the definition of the Serbian nation based on Orthodoxy and the Croatian nation based on Catholicism.

=== Literature ===
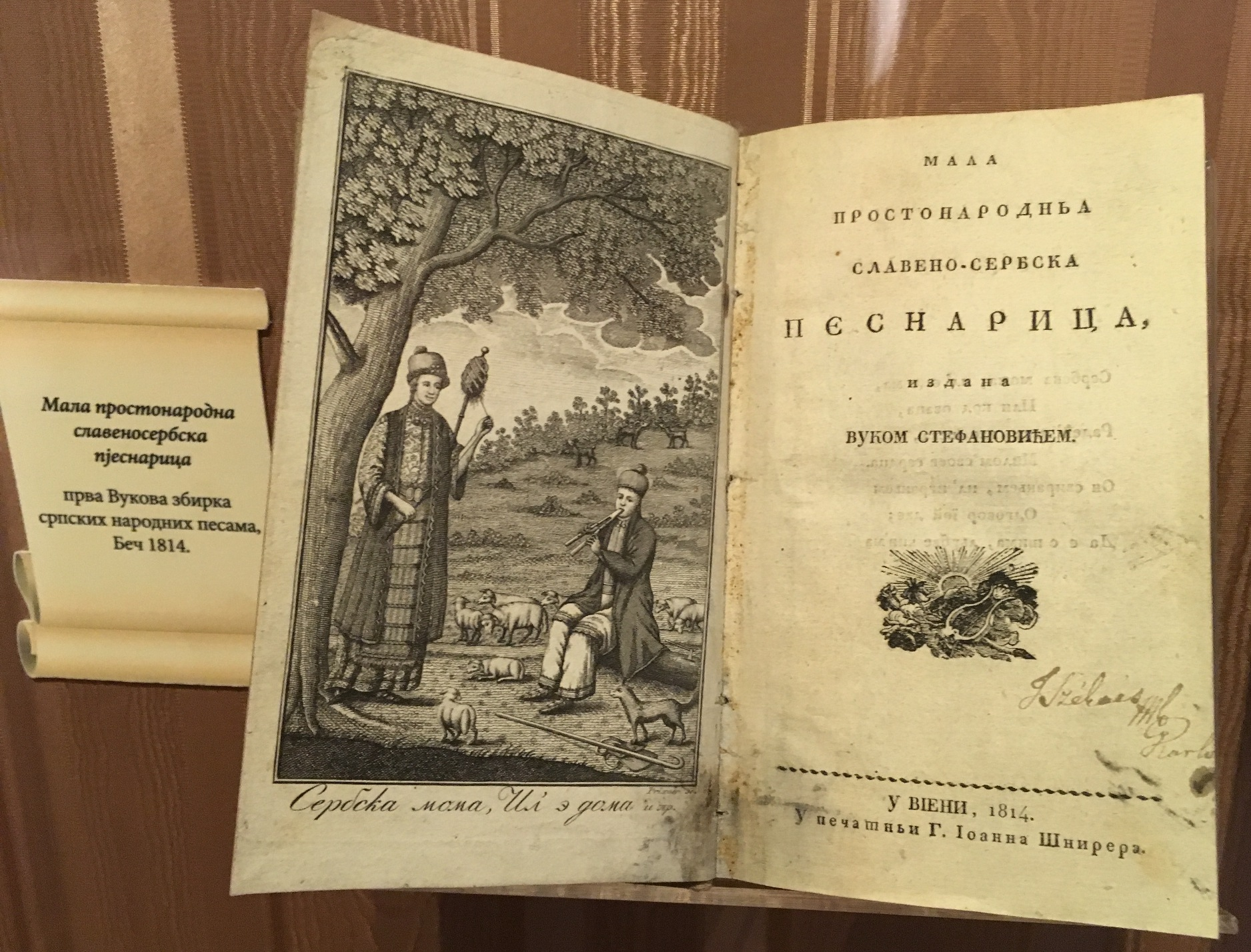
Pjesnarica (1814)

In addition to his linguistic reforms, Karadžić also contributed to folk literature, using peasant culture as the foundation. Because of his peasant upbringing, he closely associated with the oral literature of the peasants, compiling it to use in his collection of folk songs, tales, and proverbs. While Karadžić hardly considered peasant life romantic, he regarded it as an integral part of Serbian culture. He collected several volumes of folk prose and poetry, including a book of over 100 lyrical and epic songs learned as a child and written down from memory. He also published the first dictionary of vernacular Serbian. For his work he received little financial aid, at times living in poverty, though in the very last 9 years he did receive a pension from prince Miloš Obrenović. In some cases Karadžić hid the fact that he had not only collected folk poetry by recording the oral literature but transcribed it from manuscript songbooks of other collectors from Syrmia.

His work had a chief role in establishing the importance of the Kosovo Myth in Serbian national identity and history. Karadžić collected traditional epic poems related to the topic of the Battle of Kosovo and released the so-called "Kosovo cycle", which became the final version of the transformation of the myth. He mostly published oral songs, with special reference to the heroic deeds of Prince Marko and the Kosovo Battle-related events, just like the singers sang without changes or additions. Karadžić collected most of the poems about Prince Lazar near the monasteries on Fruška Gora, mostly because the seat of the Serbian Orthodox Church was moved there after the Great Migrations of the Serbs.

=== Non-philological work ===
Besides his achievement on literary field, Karadžić gave his contribution to Serbian anthropology in combination with the ethnography of that time. He left notes on physical aspects of the human body alongside his ethnographic notes. He introduced a terminology on body parts (from head to toes) into the literary language. It should be mentioned that these terms are still used, both in science and everyday speech. He gave, among other things, his own interpretation of the connection between environment and inhabitants, with parts on nourishment, living conditions, hygiene, diseases and funeral customs. All in all this considerable contribution of Vuk Karadžić is not that famous or studied.

He collected historical sources and applied a critical approach to the study of Serbian history.

In his work Geografičesko-statističkom opisu Srbije (Geographical and Statistical Description of Serbia) published in 1828, he systematically analyzed old towns, cities, and settlements, classifying them into three levels according to their size and administrative function. He used vernacular names and distinguished fortified from unfortified settlements, demonstrating the continuity of urban development in Serbia. His work reveals the deep roots of Serbian urban centers and their role in society, forming a foundation for historical research on urbanization.

== Recognition and legacy ==
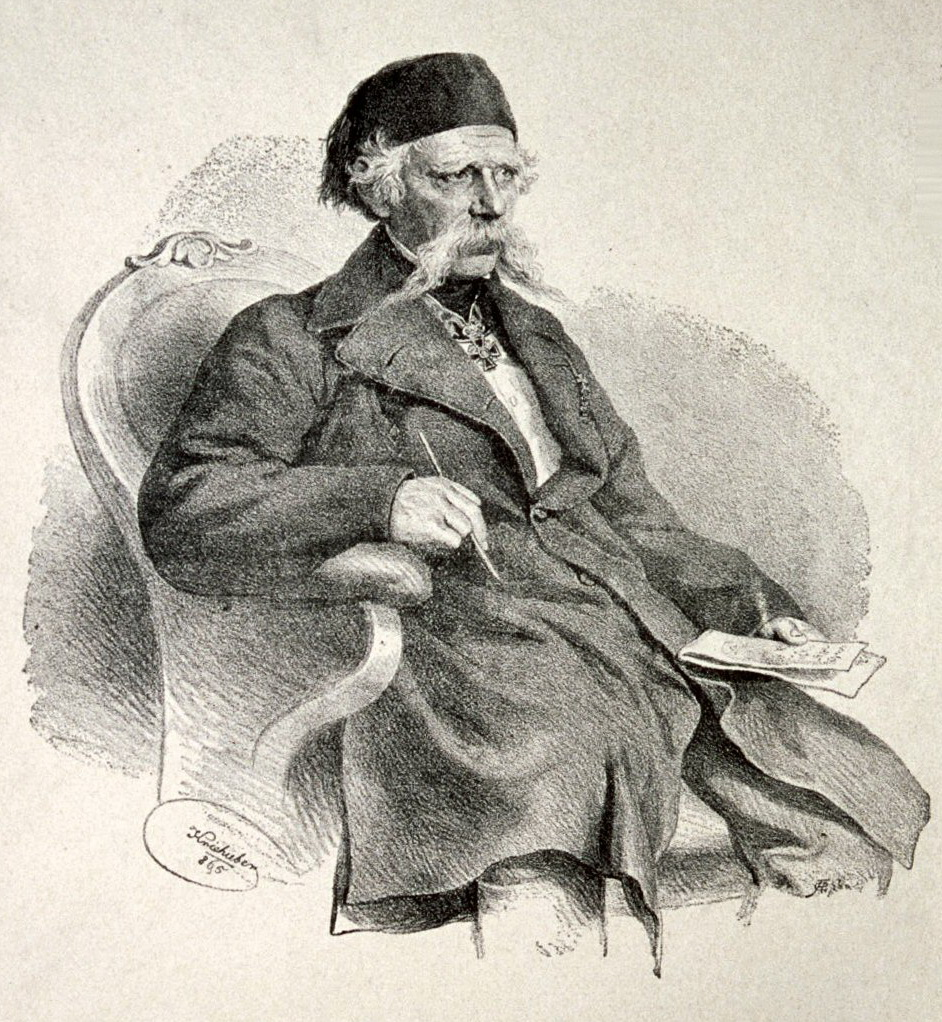
Vuk Karadžić, lithography by Josef Kriehuber, 1865

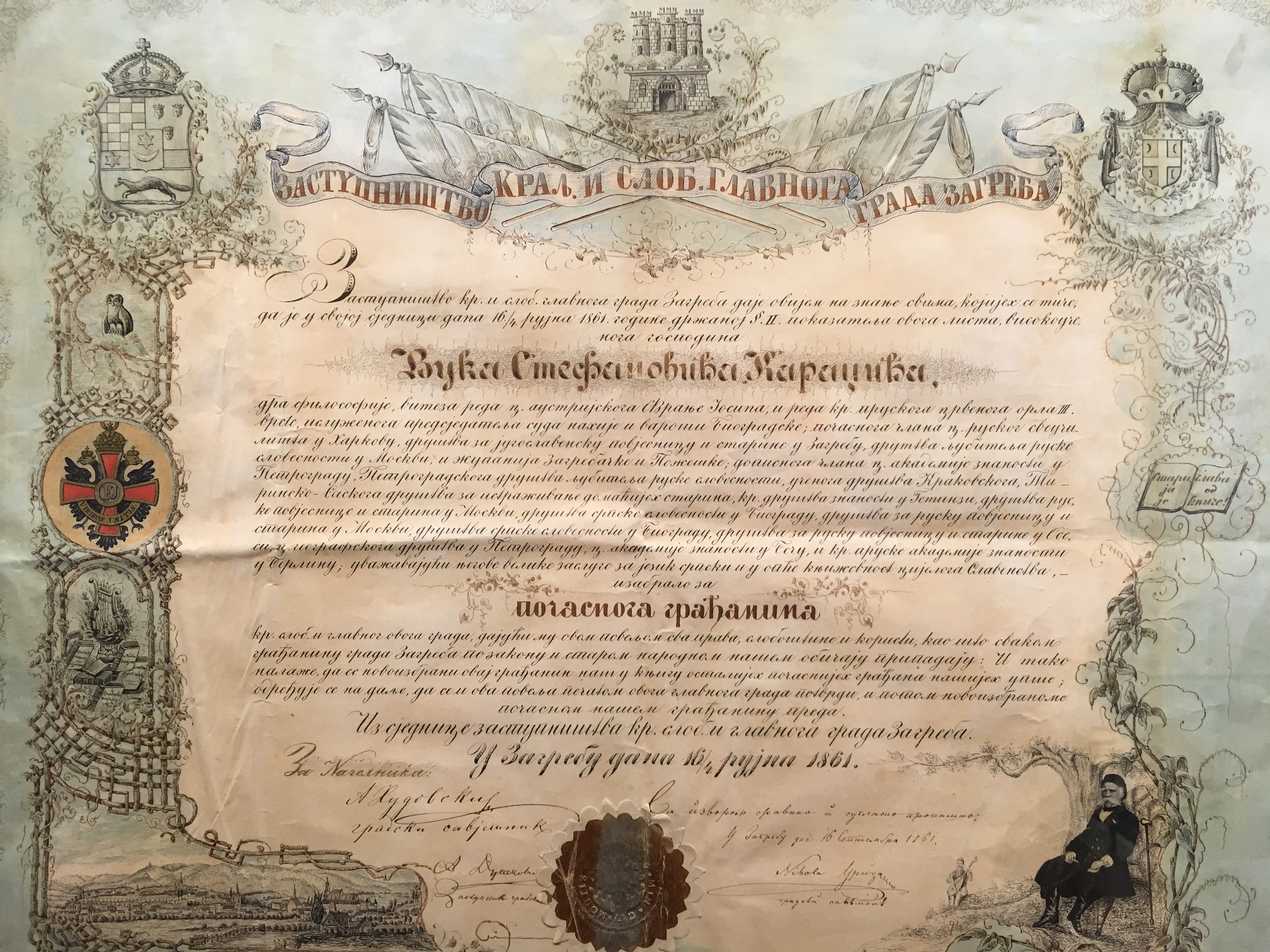
A diploma given to Karadžić, making him the honorary citizen of Zagreb

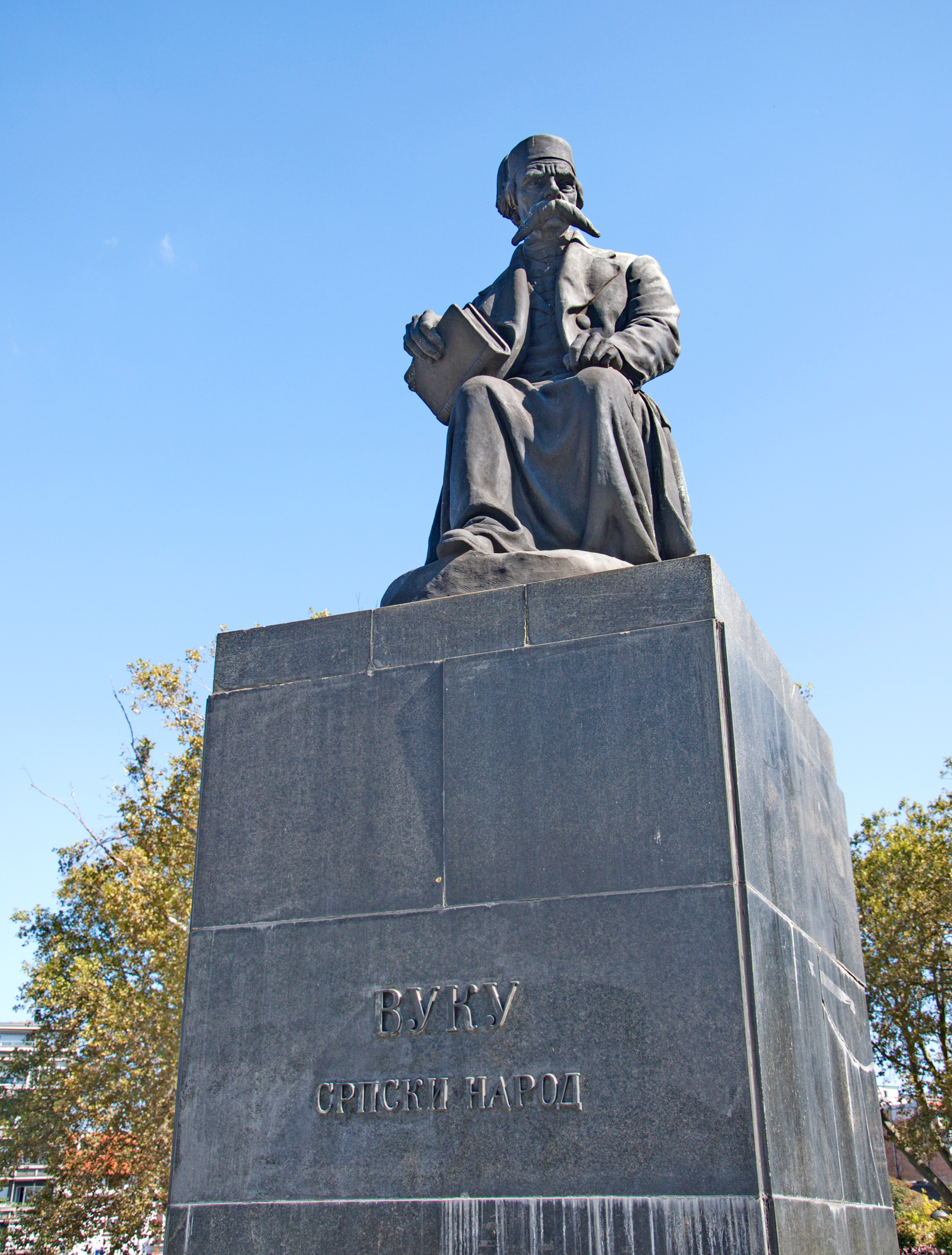
Monument to Vuk Karadžić, Belgrade.

Literary historian Jovan Deretić summarized his work as "During his fifty years of tireless activity, he accomplished as much as an entire academy of sciences."

Karadžić was honored across Europe. He was chosen as a member of various European learned societies, including the Imperial Academy of Sciences in Vienna, Prussian Academy of Sciences and Russian Imperial Academy of Sciences. He received several honorary doctorates, and was decorated by Russian and Austro-Hungarian monarchs, Prussian king, Order of Prince Danilo I and Russian academy of science. UNESCO proclaimed 1987 the year of Vuk Karadzić. Karadžić was also named an honorary citizen of the city of Zagreb.

Vukov Sabor cultural event was established in Tršić on the day of the opening of the renovated birth house of Vuk Karadžić, September 17, 1933. Since then it has been held annually in September, with 20-30,000 visitors in attendance. On the 100th anniversary of Karadžić's death (in 1964) student work brigades on youth action "Tršić 64" raised an amphitheater with a stage that was needed for organizing the Vukov sabor, and students' Vukov sabor. In 1987 Tršić received a comprehensive overhaul as a cultural-historical monument. Also, the road from Karadžić's home to Tronoša monastery was built. Karadžić's birth house was declared Monument of Culture of Exceptional Importance in 1979, and it is protected by Republic of Serbia. Recently, rural tourism has become popular in Tršić, with many families converting their houses into buildings designed to accommodate guests. TV series based on his life were broadcast on Radio Television of Serbia. His portrait is often seen in Serbian schools. Federal Republic of Yugoslavia and Serbia and Montenegro awarded a state Order of Vuk Karadžić.

Vuk's Foundation maintains the legacy of Vuk Stefanović Karadžić in Serbia and Serb diaspora as well. A student of primary (age six or seven to fourteen or fifteen) or secondary (age fourteen or fifteen to eighteen or nineteen) school in Serbia, that is awarded best grades for all subjects at the end of a school year, for each year in turn, is awarded at the end of his final year a "Vuk Karadžić diploma" and is known (in common speech) as "Vukovac", a name given to a member of an elite group of the highest performing students.

The essence of modern Serbian spelling is summed up with: Write as you speak and read as it is written. Although the above quotation is often attributed to Vuk Stefanović Karadžić in Serbia, it is in fact an orthographic principle devised by the German grammarian and philologist Johann Christoph Adelung. Karadžić merely used that principle to push through his language reform.

== Works ==
- Mala prostonarodna slaveno-serbska pesnarica, Vienna, 1814
- Pismenica serbskoga jezika, Vienna, 1814
- Narodna srbska pjesnarica II, Vienna, 1815
- O Vidakovićevom romanu, 1817
- Srpski rječnik istolkovan njemačkim i latinskim riječma (Serbian Dictionary, paralleled with German and Latin words), Vienna, 1818
- O Ljubibratićevim prevodima, 1820
- Narodne srpske pripovjetke, Vienna, 1821, supplemented edition, 1853
- Narodne srpske pjesme I-V, Vienna and Leipzig, 1823–1864
- Luke Milovanova Opit nastavlenja k Srbskoj sličnorečnosti i slogomjerju ili prosodii, Vienna, 1823
- Mala srpska gramatika, Leipzig, 1824
- Žizni i podvigi Knjaza Miloša Obrenovića, Saint Petersburg, 1825
- Žitije Ajduk-Veljka Petrovića, 1826
- Danica I-V, Vienna, 1826–1834
- Žitije Đorđa Arsenijevića, Emanuela, Buda, 1827
- Prvi srpski bukvar, 1827
- Miloš Obrenović, knjaz Srbije ili gradja za srpsku istoriju našega vremena, Buda, 1828
- Prva godina srpskog vojevanja na daije, 1828
- Kao srpski Plutarh, ili žitija znatni Srbalja, 1829
- Druga godina srpskog vojevanja na daije, 1834
- Narodne srpske poslovice i druge različne, kao i one u običaj uzete riječi, Cetinje, 1836
- Montenegro und die Montenegriner: ein Beitrag zur Kenntnis der europäischen Türkei und des serbischen Volkes, Stuttgart and Tübingen, 1837
- Odgovori Jovanu Hadžiću – Milošu Svetiću na njegove Sitnice jezikoslovne (1839) and Utuke (1843, 1847)
- Odgovor na laži i opadanja u «Srpskom ulaku», 1844
- Pisma Platonu Atanackoviću, Vienna, 1845
- Kovčežić za istoriju, jezik i običaje Srba sva tri zakona ("A Case of History, Language and Traditions of Serbs of all three Creeds"), Vienna, 1849
- Primeri Srpsko-slovenskog jezika, Vienna, 1857
- Praviteljstvujušči sovjet, Vienna, 1860
- Srpske narodne pjesme iz Hercegovine, Vienna, 1866
- Život i običaji naroda srpskog, Vienna, 1867
- Nemačko srpski rečnik, Vienna, 1872
- Sunce se djevojkom ženi

Translations:

- New Testament, Vienna, 1847

== See also ==
- Vienna Literary Agreement
- Museum of Vuk and Dositej

=== People closely related to Karadžić's work ===
- Živana Antonijević
- Tešan Podrugović
- Lukijan Mušicki
- Filip Višnjić
- Sima Milutinović Sarajlija
- Dimitrije Davidović
- Branko Radičević
- Petar II Petrović-Njegoš
- Ljudevit Gaj
- Franz Miklosich
- Ivan Mažuranić
- Sava Mrkalj
- Đuro Daničić
- Jernej Kopitar
