= Sava Mrkalj =

Serbian linguist (1783–1833)

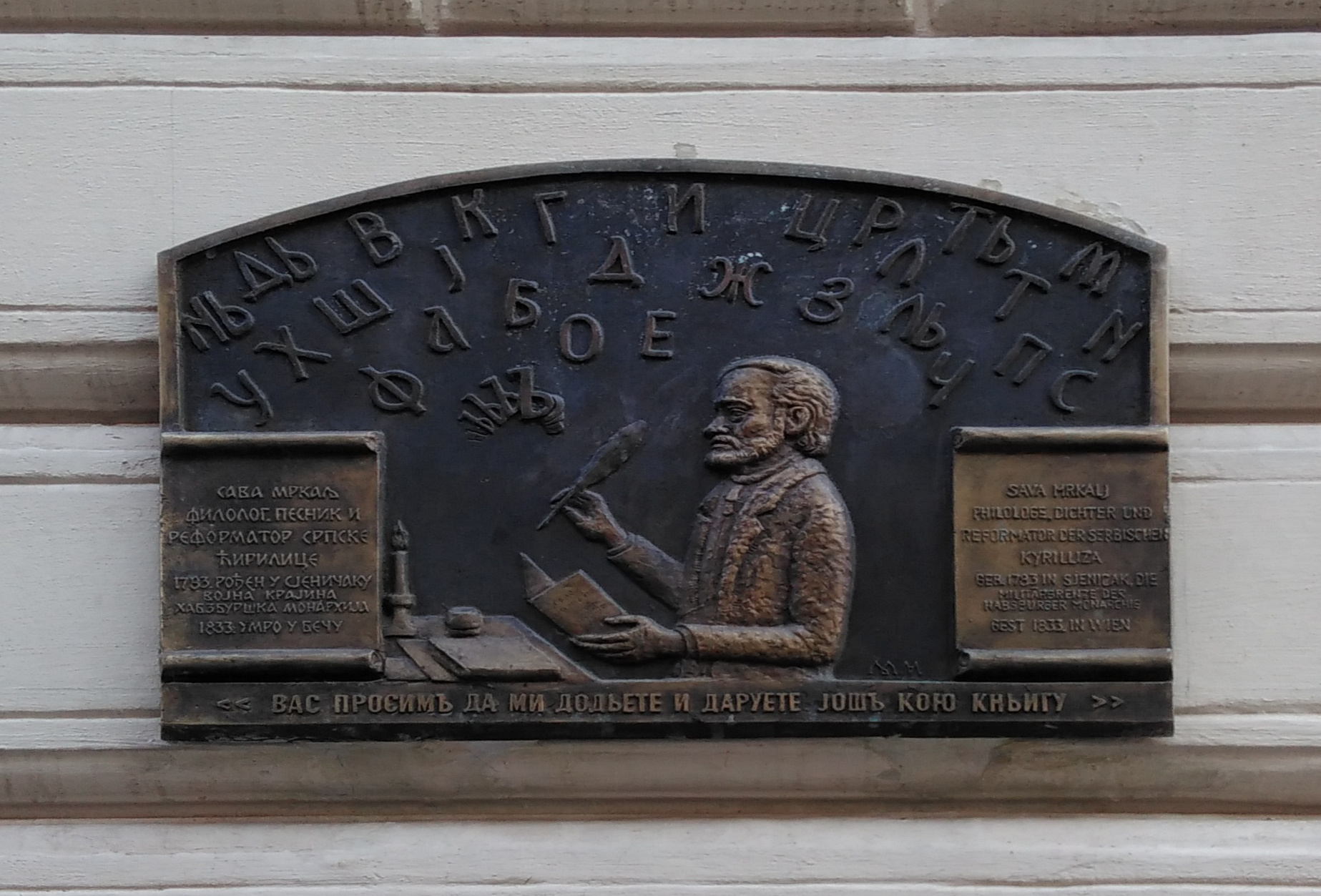
- Commemorative plaque to Sava Mrkalj, 1030 Vienna Veithgasse 3
- Born: 1783; Sjeničak, Military Frontier, Austrian Empire (now Croatia)
- Died: 1833 (aged 49–50); Vienna, Austrian Empire
- Occupations: Linguistics, philology, poetry
- Known for: Serbian language reform

Sava Mrkalj (Merkailo, 1783–1833) was a Serb writer and poet. Proposing to reform the Serbian orthography, he was a precursor to Vuk Karadžić.

== Biography ==
Mrkalj was born in the hamlet of Sjeničak in the region of Kordun, at the time part of the Military Frontier. He attended high school in Zagreb and studied philosophy and mathematics at the Pest University. In 1810 in Budapest, he made the acquaintance of Vuk Karadžić, who regarded him as an expert in Serbian. Literary Serbian was then an artificial Slavic dialect (Slavonic-Serbian) modeled after Russian and very different from the factual spoken language, and had neither standard orthography, dictionary nor grammar.

Around 1805 he began to devote himself to philology, inspired by the works of Adelung and Solarić. Mrkalj knew German, French, Latin, Greek and Hebrew. In a publication titled Сало дебелога јера либо азбукопротрес (lit. 'Fat of the Thick Yer, i.e. Alphabet Inquiry'; Buda, 1810), he proposed to simplify the original Church Slavonic Cyrillic script from forty-two to twenty-six letters. While highly lauded by Kopitar, his ideas were too radical for the Serbian church, which had been using the traditional Cyrillic script since the times of Cyril and Methodius.

To prove his loyalty, Mrkalj became a monk in Gomirje in 1811, but was harassed and despised by fellow monks and church authorities alike. He left the monastery in 1813 to live on in extreme poverty. In 1817, in an attempt to reconcile with the church, he retracted his view in A Palinode (or Defense of the Thick Yer), which is far less brilliant than his earlier work. Karadžić then took the idea further in his Serbian Dictionary of 1818, also adopting a modernized version of Mrazović's Slavene-Serbic grammar. Mrkalj also published ten poems in the Serbian newspapers Novine serbske, Srbski rodoljubac, and Golubica.

Later in life, Mrkalj became mentally ill and was hospitalised in Vienna's imperial mental hospital in 1827. He suffered from a persecution complex and outbursts of rage, which led him to stab a Serb drawing teacher in the neck over a petty argument. At the asylum, Vuk Karadžić came to visit him at least once. Mrkalj died in 1833.
