= Johann Christoph Adelung =

German philologist (1732–1806)

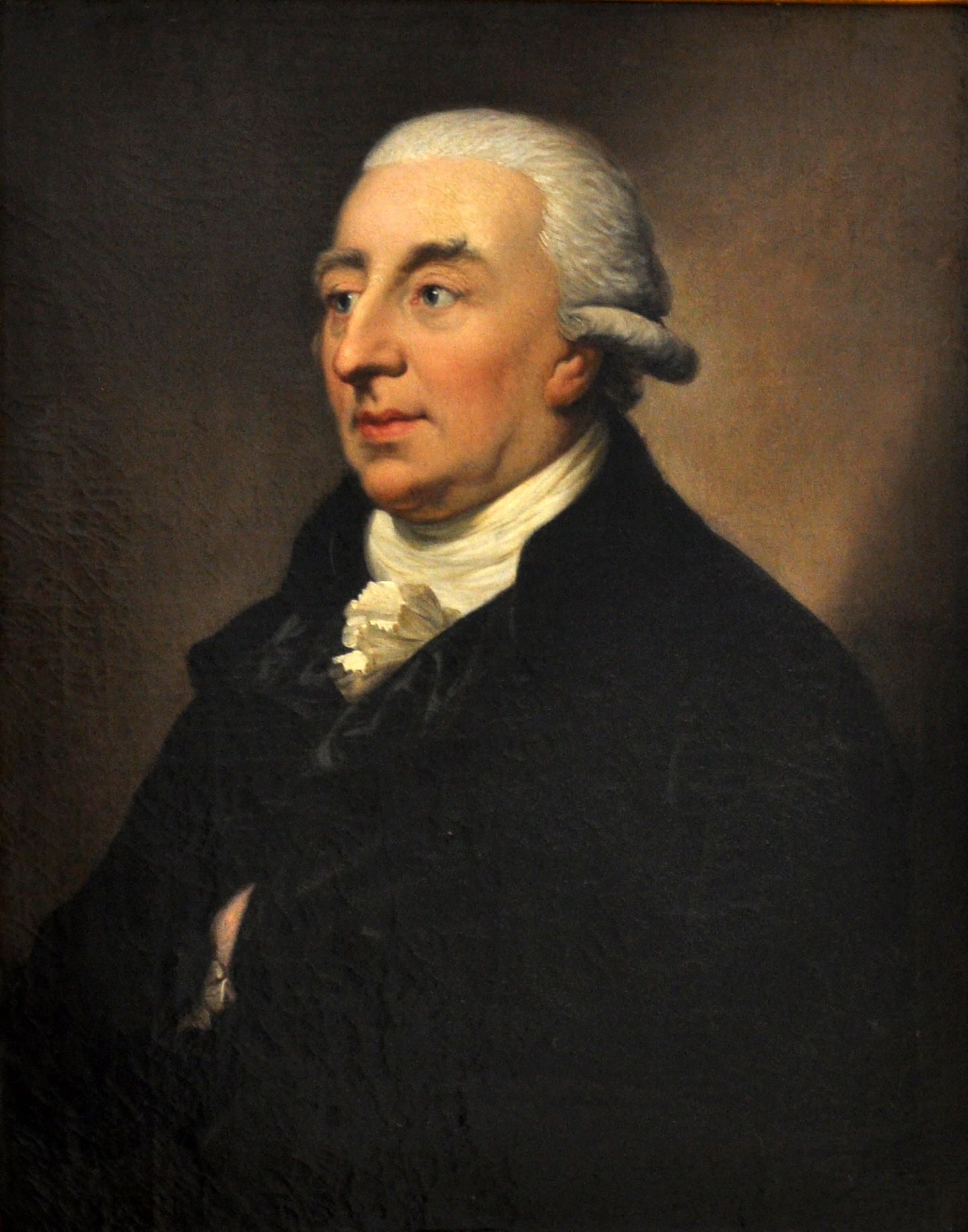
- Portrait by Anton Graff, 1803
- Born: 8 August 1732; Spantekow
- Died: 10 September 1806 (aged 74); Dresden, Kingdom of Saxony (now Germany)

Philosophical work
- Main interests: Philology

Johann Christoph Adelung (8 August 1732 – 10 September 1806) was a German grammarian and philologist.

== Biography ==
He was born at Spantekow, in Western Pomerania, then part of the Holy Roman Empire and educated at schools in Anklam and Berge Monastery, Magdeburg, and the University of Halle also all in the Holy Roman Empire. In 1759 he was appointed professor at the gymnasium of Erfurt, but relinquished this situation two years later and went to reside in a private capacity at Leipzig, where he devoted himself to philological researches. In 1787 he received the appointment of principal librarian to the Elector of Saxony at Dresden, where he continued to reside until his death in 1806.

== Work ==
Adelung was a prolific writer, producing grammars, a dictionary, and various works on German style, all of which contributed towards rectifying the orthography, refining the idiom, and fixing the standard of his native tongue. His German dictionary Grammatisch-kritisches Wörterbuch der hochdeutschen Mundart (1774–1786) bears witness to the spirit of investigation which Adelung possessed, and to his thorough knowledge of the different dialects on which modern German is based.

Shortly before his death, he issued Mithridates, oder allgemeine Sprachenkunde (1806). The hint of this work appears to have been taken from a publication with a similar title, published by Konrad von Gesner in 1555, but the plan of Adelung was much more extensive. Unfortunately, he did not live to finish what he had undertaken. The first volume, which contains the Asiatic languages, was published immediately after his death; the other two were issued under the superintendence of Johann Severin Vater (1771–1826). Of the very numerous works by Adelung, the following may be noted: Directorium diplomaticum (Meissen, 1802); Deutsche Sprachlehre für Schulen (Berlin, 1781), and the periodical, Magazin für die deutsche Sprache (1782–1784).

He believed strongly that the orthography of the written language should match that of the spoken language. He declared, "Write as you speak and read as it is written".
