= Bohorič alphabet =

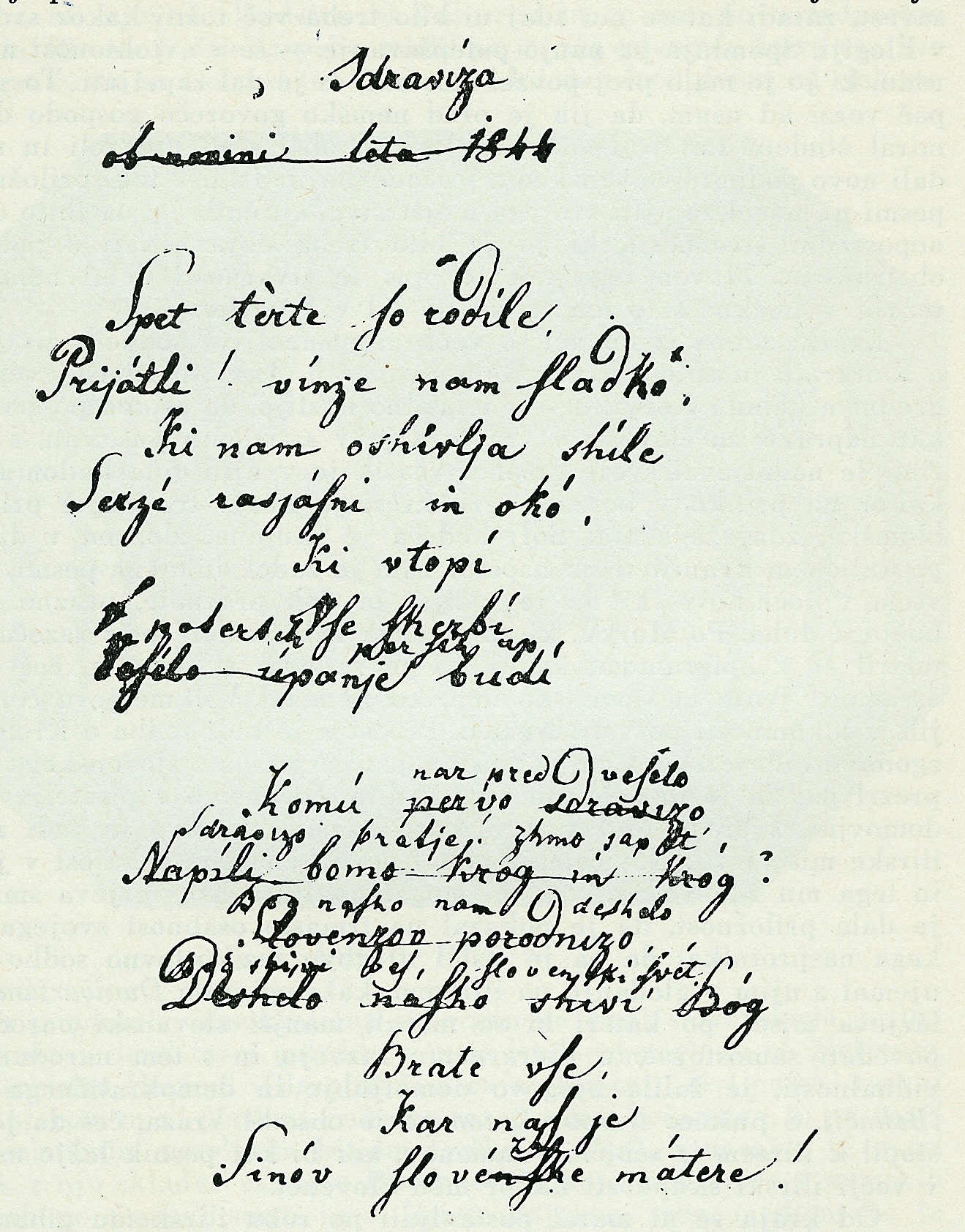
Zdravljica by France Prešeren, first version in the Bohorič alphabet

The Bohorič alphabet (Slovene: bohoričica) was an orthography used for Slovene between the 16th and 19th centuries.

== Origins ==
Its name is derived from Adam Bohorič, who codified the alphabet in his book Articae Horulae Succisivae. It was printed in 1583 and published in 1584.

The Bohorič alphabet was first used by the Lutheran preacher Primož Trubar, the author of the first printed book in Slovene. However, Trubar did not follow strict rules and often used alternate spellings for the same word.

== Characteristics ==
The alphabet consists of 25 letters (including 3 digraphs) in the following order:

a b d e f g h i j k l m n o p r ſ ſh s sh t u v z zh

The Bohorič alphabet differs from the modern Slovene alphabet in the following letters:

Bohorič alphabet
| majuscule | minuscule | IPA | modern Slovenian |
|---|---|---|---|
| Z | z | /ts/ | c |
| ZH | zh | /tʃ/ | č |
| S, ⸲S | ſ | /s/ | s |
| SH, ⸲SH | ſh | /ʃ/ | š |
| S | s | /z/ | z |
| SH | sh | /ʒ/ | ž |

(In these cases, the values of the Bohorič letters somewhat resemble German.)

In the early Bohorič alphabet, some letters shared majuscule forms:

- I was the majuscule form of i and j
- V was the majuscule form of u and v
- S was the majuscule form of s and ſ
- SH was the majuscule form of sh and ſh

There were other differences from the modern Slovene orthography. The schwa sound preceding R was strictly written with the letter E, while in modern Slovene the E is omitted (except before word-final R): the Slovene name for the city of Trieste, Trst, was thus written as Terſt, the word for "square" was written as terg (instead of the modern trg), etc. One-letter prepositions, such as v (in), s/z (with), or k/g (to) were written with an apostrophe: thus, the phrase "in Ljubljana" would be written v'Ljubljani instead of modern Slovene v Ljubljani, "to my place" would be k'meni instead of modern k meni, etc.

The IETF language tags have assigned the variant sl-bohoric to Slovene in the Bohorič alphabet.

== Historical development ==
Bohorič's alphabet was first codified in 1584 by the Protestant author Adam Bohorič in his book Articae horulae succisivae, considered to be the first grammar book of Slovene. It was based on the Latin script adopted from the German by Primož Trubar since 1555 and then used extensively for almost thirty years. It differed somewhat from the original alphabet, partly also due to changes introduced by Sebastjan Krelj and Jurij Dalmatin. It was used in Dalmatin's first translation of the entire Bible into Slovene.

Although the Counter-Reformation destroyed completely the Protestant religious community in the Slovene Lands, the alphabet was taken over by Catholic authors, most notably by the Roman Catholic bishop of Ljubljana Thomas Chrön. In the 17th and early 18th century, very few literary texts were written in Slovene; nevertheless, Bohorič's alphabet remained in use throughout this period. Slovene names in Valvasor's German-language book The Glory of the Duchy of Carniola, for example, were all rendered in this script.

In the late 18th century, with the revival of Slovene, Bohorič's script came back into general use. It was modernized by 18th-century philologists Marko Pohlin and Jurij Japelj. By the end of the 18th century, it was fully accepted by the Enlightenment intellectuals around Sigmund Zois. With the authors Anton Tomaž Linhart and Valentin Vodnik, it became an established tool of literary expression again.

The Bohorič alphabet was quite successful, but it suffered from a number of flaws:

- Slovenian has eight vowels, but the Bohorič alphabet only has five vowel characters (this flaw is shared by modern Slovenian orthography).
- The combination "sh" could be read as two separate letters or as a digraph (although this is relevant for only a handful of words, such as shujšati 'to lose weight').
- It did not distinguish vowel length (nor does modern Slovenian orthography).
- It did not distinguish tone (nor does modern Slovenian orthography).

== Replacement ==
The script remained unchallenged until the 1820s, when there were several attempts to replace them with phonetic alphabets. The two best-known attempts were made by Peter Dajnko (Dajnko alphabet) in 1824 and Fran Metelko (Metelko alphabet) in 1825.

These attempts, sponsored by the philologist Jernej Kopitar, were however fiercely opposed by the Romantic intellectual circle around Matija Čop and France Prešeren. This debate over orthographic reform became known as the so-called Slovene alphabet war (Slovene: slovenska abecedna vojna or črkarska pravda, German: slowenischer ABC-Krieg). By the mid-1830s, the supporters of Bohorič's script gained their battle against the innovators, also with the support of the Czech linguist František Čelakovský. However, criticisms of the bohoričica script remained alive.

In the 1840s, the editor Janez Bleiweis proposed a compromise solution by introducing a slightly modified version of Gaj's Latin alphabet (in turn modeled on the Czech one) for his newspaper Kmetijske in rokodelske novice. Very quickly, this solution was accepted by all sides, and by 1848/1850, a modified version of Gaj's alphabet completely replaced Bohorič's script; it remains in use in Slovenia today.

== Attempts at revival ==
Suggestions to revive the Bohorič script were advanced in the 1980s. Several people suggested that a modified version of the script should be revived for IT purposes because the first computers for general use could not handle non-standard Latin characters (i.e., č š ž). In the 1990s, a "reformed Bohorič alphabet" (in fact, it merely replaced č š ž with ch sh zh and thus did not follow the Bohorič orthography at all) was adopted by a group of authors around the journal SRP. This has been the only attempt to revive the Bohorič alphabet and has gained no attention outside the editorial board of the journal.
