= Gaj's Latin alphabet =

Form of Latin script used to write Serbo-Croatian

Gaj's Latin alphabet Gajeva latinica / Гајева латиница
- Script type: Alphabet
- Period: early 19th century – present
- Languages: Serbo-Croatian; Bosnian; Croatian; Montenegrin; Serbian

Related scripts
- Parent systems: Egyptian hieroglyphs: Proto-Sinaitic alphabet; Phoenician alphabet; Greek alphabet; Old Italic scripts; Latin alphabet; Czech alphabet; Gaj's Latin alphabet
- Child systems: Slovene alphabet Montenegrin Latin alphabet Macedonian Latin alphabet Bulgarian Latin alphabet
- Sister systems: Latvian alphabet Lithuanian alphabet

Unicode
- Unicode range: subset of Latin

Gaj's Latin alphabet (Note: Serbo-Croatian: Gajeva latinica / Гајева латиница, pronounced [ɡâːjeva latǐnit͡sa]) (Note: Also known as abeceda, Serbo-Croatian Cyrillic: абецеда, pronounced [abet͡sěːda], gajica, гајица, pronounced [ɡǎjit͡sa] and latinica, латиница) is the form of the Latin script used for writing all four standard varieties of Serbo-Croatian: Bosnian, Croatian, Montenegrin, and Serbian. It contains 30 letters: 22 letters of basic Latin alphabet (excluding Q, W, X, Y), 5 letters with diacritics (Č, Ć, Đ, Š, Ž) and 3 digraphs (Dž, Lj, Nj). Each letter (including digraphs) represents one Serbo-Croatian phoneme, yielding a highly phonemic orthography. It closely corresponds to the Serbian Cyrillic alphabet.

The alphabet was initially devised by Croatian linguist Ljudevit Gaj during the Illyrian movement. The alphabet's final form was defined in the late 19th century with contributions from other linguists, and it has since been in standard use. It was also the basis for a number of other Latin alphabets and romanizations in southeastern Europe. In Serbia, where Cyrillic is more prestigious, Gaj's Latin is nevertheless very common in media and everyday life.

== Letters ==
The alphabet consists of thirty upper and lower case letters:

Majuscule forms (also called uppercase or capital letters)
A	B	C	Č	Ć	D	Dž	Đ	E	F	G	H	I	J	K	L	Lj	M	N	Nj	O	P	R	S	Š	T	U	V	Z	Ž
Minuscule forms (also called lowercase or small letters)
a	b	c	č	ć	d	dž	đ	e	f	g	h	i	j	k	l	lj	m	n	nj	o	p	r	s	š	t	u	v	z	ž
Broad IPA Value
/a/	/b/	/t͡s/	/t͡ʃ/	/t͡ɕ/	/d/	/d͡ʒ/	/d͡ʑ/	/e/	/f/	/ɡ/	/x/	/i/	/j/	/k/	/l/	/ʎ/	/m/	/n/	/ɲ/	/o/	/p/	/r/	/s/	/ʃ/	/t/	/u/	/ʋ/	/z/	/ʒ/

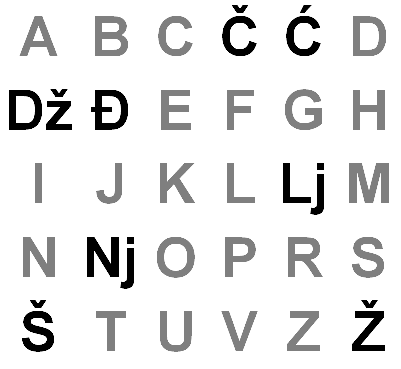
Gaj's Latin alphabet omits 4 letters (q,w,x,y) from the ISO Basic Latin alphabet.

Letters are referred to by their name: a, be, ce, če, će, de, dže, đe, e, ef, ge, ha, i, je, ka, el, elj, em, en, enj, o, pe, er, es, eš, te, u, ve, ze, že, or, in the case of consonants, by being appended by schwa, e.g. /fə/. In mathematics, ⟨j⟩ is commonly pronounced jot, as in German Standard German.

=== Foreign letters ===
Various foreign letters are utilised in orthographically unadapted loanwords and foreign proper names, such as Québec. Orthographically unadapted spelling of foreign names and some loanwords is standard in Croatia, whereas Serbians prefer to use orthographically adapted spellings. Non-native letters Q, W, X, and Y appear on the Serbo-Croatian keyboard. These four letters are usually named as follows: ⟨q⟩ as kve or ku, ⟨w⟩ as duplo ve or dvostruko ve, ⟨x⟩ as iks, and ⟨y⟩ as ipsilon.

== Digraphs ==
Digraphs ⟨dž⟩, ⟨lj⟩ and ⟨nj⟩ are considered to be single letters, and they signify single phonemes. However, they are distinguished from occurrences of two such letters that signify two distinct phonemes: džep (/d͡ʒêp/, Cyrillic џеп) uses the digraph, while nadživjeti (/nadʒǐːvjeti/, Cyrillic надживјети, morphological boundary: prefix nad- + base živjeti) uses two separate letters.

- In dictionaries, njegov comes after novine, in a separate ⟨nj⟩ section after the end of the ⟨n⟩ section; bolje comes after bolnica; nadžak (digraph ⟨dž⟩) comes after nadživjeti (⟨d⟩+⟨ž⟩ sequence), and so forth.
- If only the initial letter of a word is capitalized, only the first of the two component letters is capitalized: Njemačka ('Germany'), not NJemačka. Uppercase is used only if the entire word was capitalized: NJEMAČKA. In Unicode, the form ⟨Nj⟩ is referred to as titlecase, as opposed to the uppercase form ⟨NJ⟩, representing one of the few cases in which titlecase and uppercase differ.

U LJ; E	M J E NJ; A Č N I C A

- In vertical writing (such as on signs), ⟨dž⟩, ⟨lj⟩, ⟨nj⟩ are written horizontally, as a unit. For instance, if ulje ('oil') is written vertically, ⟨lj⟩ appears on the second line. In crossword puzzles, ⟨dž⟩, ⟨lj⟩, ⟨nj⟩ each occupy a single square. The word mjenjačnica ('bureau de change') is written vertically with ⟨nj⟩ on the fourth line, while ⟨m⟩ and ⟨j⟩ appear separately on the first and second lines, respectively, because ⟨mj⟩ contains two letters, not one.
- If words are written with a space between each letter (such as on signs), each digraph is written as a unit. For instance: U LJ E, M J E NJ A Č N I C A.

== Accent marks ==
The vowels a, e, i, o, u, along with the syllabic consonants r and l, can take one of 5 accents: the double grave accent (◌̏) for a short vowel with falling tone, the inverted breve (◌̑) for a long vowel with falling tone, the grave accent (◌̀) for a short vowel with rising tone, the acute accent (◌́) for long vowel with rising tone, and macron (◌̄) for a non-tonic long vowel. These diacritic accents are typically used in dictionaries and linguistic publications, and in poetry to denote metrically correct reading. In ordinary prose they occur when needed to resolve semantic ambiguity between homographs: kod ('at') vs. kȏd ('code'), sam ('am') vs. sȃm ('alone'). For the same reason, the length of an unaccented syllable can be marked with ⟨◌̄⟩ or circumflex ⟨◌̂⟩, without accentuating the rest of the word. This is typically used to distinguish homographic nominative or genitive singular and genitive plural forms of nouns, where the genitive plural has a long final vowel: knjiga ('book' Nsg.) vs. knjigâ or knjigā ('books' Gpl.), prijatelja ('friend' Gsg.) vs. prijateljâ or prijateljā ('friends' Gpl.).

== History ==
=== Croatian Latin alphabet before Gaj ===
In Croatian writing the Latin alphabet became dominant in the 16th century, marginalising the Cyrillic and the Glagolitic alphabets. In the 17th century there coalesced two major orthographic practices for using the Latin alphabet. Dalmatia used a system based on the Italian orthography, whereas the continental Kaykavian writing was based on Hungarian. In the 18th century the Slavonian orthography arose as well, a mixture of the previous two. However, the specifics of the alphabetic systems tended to vary from writer to writer.

In addition to these three widely used systems, multiple individual writers attempted their own reforms of the alphabet. These include Rajmund Đamanjić (1639), the early 1700s Dubrovnik academy work led by Đuro Matijašević and Ignjat Đurđević, as well as the early 1700s Lexicon Latino-Illyricum by Pavao Ritter Vitezović.

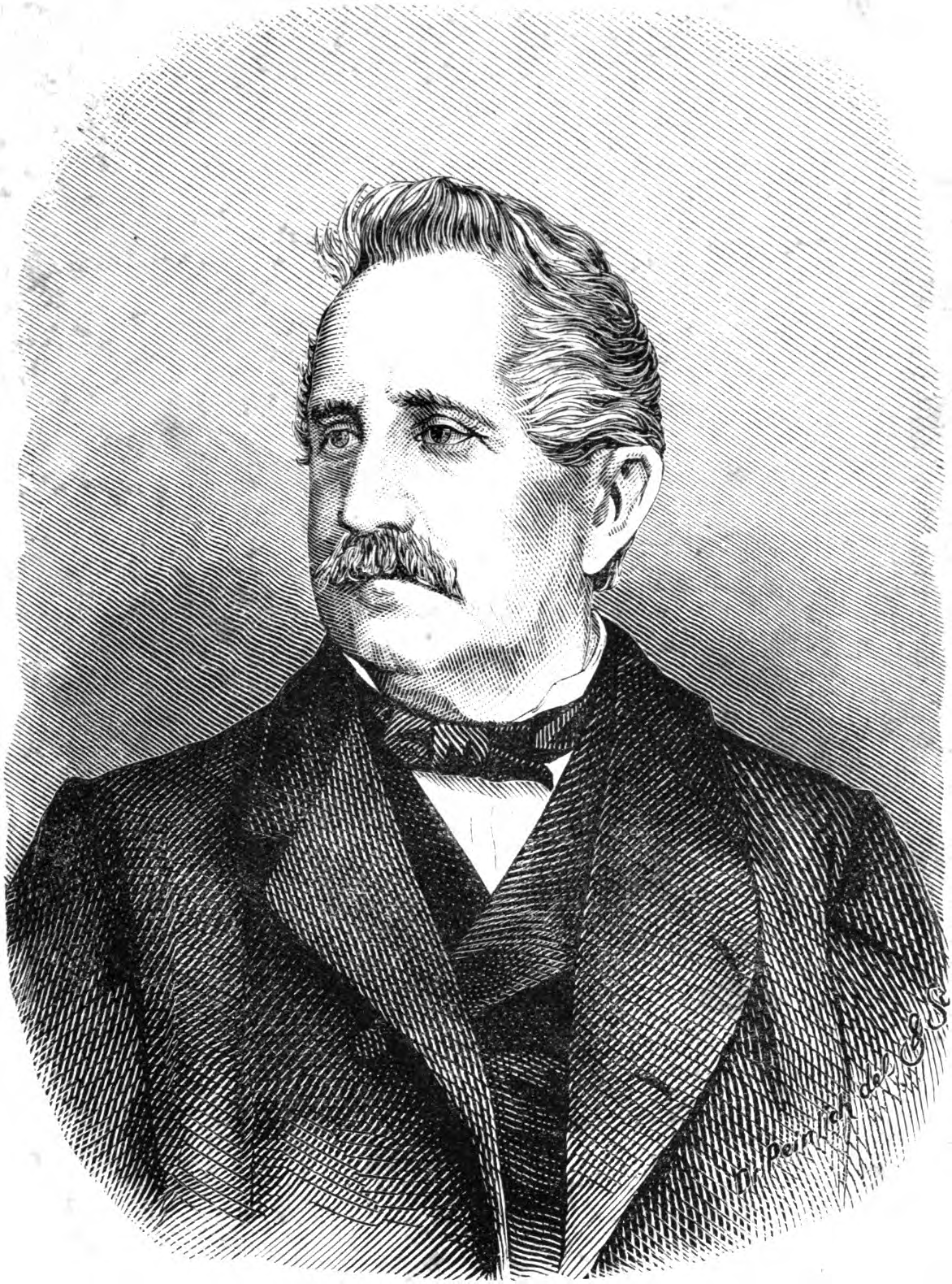
Croatian linguist Ljudevit Gaj

=== Gaj's reform and its revisions ===
The alphabet was initially devised by Croatian linguist Ljudevit Gaj in 1835 during the Illyrian movement in ethnically Croatian parts of the Austrian Empire. It was meant to serve as a unified orthography for three Croat-populated kingdoms within the Austrian Empire at the time, namely Croatia, Dalmatia and Slavonia, and their three dialect groups, Kajkavian, Chakavian and Shtokavian, which historically utilized different spelling rules.

It was largely based on Jan Hus's Czech alphabet, (č, ž, š) and Polish (ć). Gaj invented ⟨lj⟩, ⟨nj⟩ and ⟨dž⟩, according to similar solutions in Hungarian (ly, ny and dzs, although dž combinations exist also in Czech (and Polish as dż)). In 1830 in Buda, he published the book Kratka osnova horvatsko-slavenskog pravopisanja (Brief Basics of the Croatian-Slavonic Orthography), which was the first common Croatian orthography book.

Gaj followed the example of Pavao Ritter Vitezović and the Czech orthography, making one letter of the Latin script for each sound in the language. Following Vuk Karadžić's reform of Cyrillic in the early nineteenth century, in the 1830s Ljudevit Gaj did the same for latinica, using the Czech system and producing a one-to-one grapheme-phoneme correlation between the Cyrillic and Latin orthographies, resulting in a parallel system.

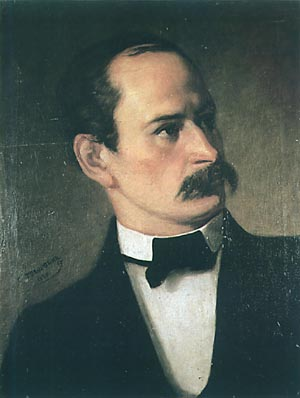
Đuro Daničić proposed the letter ⟨đ⟩ in 1878

In 1878 Đuro Daničić proposed a replacement of the digraphs ⟨dž⟩, ⟨dj⟩, (Note: At the time ⟨gj⟩ was also in use.) ⟨lj⟩ and ⟨nj⟩ with single letters: ⟨ģ⟩, ⟨đ⟩, ⟨ļ⟩ and ⟨ń⟩ respectively. Of the four, ⟨đ⟩ was accepted in Ivan Broz's 1892 Hrvatski pravopis (Croatian Orthography) and it thus became a part of the standard alphabet, though it was not immediately accepted by all writers and publishers. The digraph ⟨dj⟩ remained in use by various publications at least up to 1920s. The other three letters remained in use only in certain philological publications. Names of individual people have sometimes retained the pre-đ spelling: Ksaver Šandor Gjalski /d͡ʑâːlskiː/, Gjuro Szabo /d͡ʑǔːro/.

=== Introduction in Serbian ===
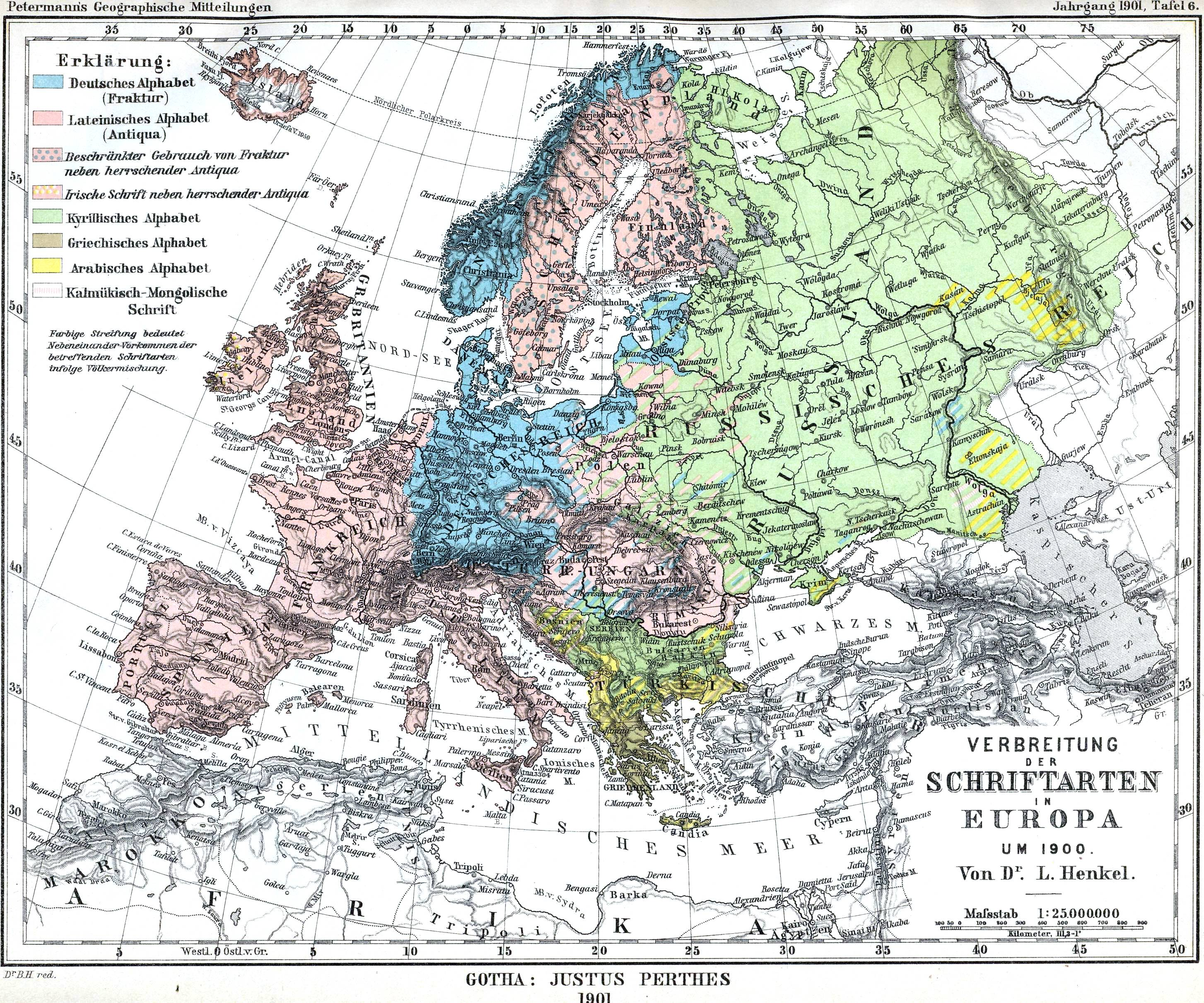
Main alphabets used in Europe around 1900: Latin script: Fraktur variant Latin script: Antiqua variant Cyrillic script Greek alphabet Arabic script Kalmyk–Mongolian script

The Latin alphabet was not initially taught in schools in Serbia when it became independent in the 19th century. After a series of efforts by Serbian writers Ljubomir Stojanović and Jovan Skerlić, it became part of the school curriculum after 1914.

During World War I, Austria-Hungary banned the Cyrillic alphabet in Bosnia and its use in occupied Serbia was banned in schools. Cyrillic was banned in the Independent State of Croatia in World War II.

The government of SFR Yugoslavia made some initial effort to promote romanization, use of the Latin alphabet even in the Orthodox Serbian and Montenegrin parts of Yugoslavia, but met with resistance. The use of latinica did however become more common among Serbian speakers, and the Serbian language became an example of digraphia.

=== Modern history ===
In late 1980s, a number of articles had been published in Serbia about a danger of Cyrillic being fully replaced by Latin, thereby endangering what was deemed a Serbian national symbol.

Following the breakup of Yugoslavia, Gaj's Latin alphabet remained in use in Bosnian and Croatian standards. Another standard of Serbo-Croatian, Montenegrin, uses a slightly modified version of it, the Montenegrin Latin alphabet.

In 1993, the authorities of Republika Srpska under Radovan Karadžić and Momčilo Krajišnik decided to proclaim Ekavian and Serbian Cyrillic to be official in Republika Srpska, which was opposed both by native Bosnian Serb writers at the time and the general public, and that decision was rescinded in 1994. Nevertheless, it was reinstated in a milder form in 1996, and today still the use of Serbian Latin is officially discouraged in Republika Srpska, in favor of Cyrillic.

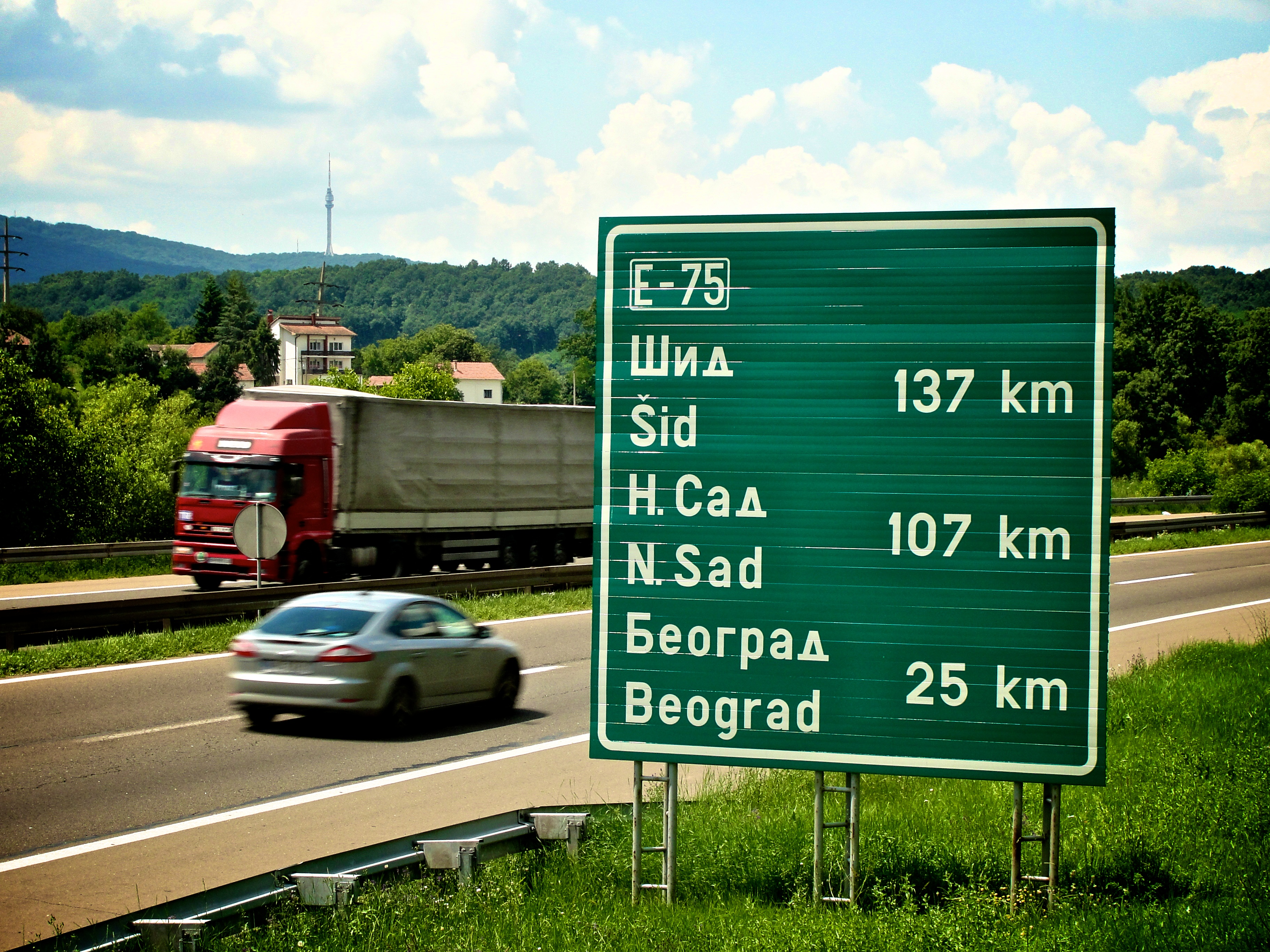
A road sign in Serbia using Cyrillic and Latin alphabets. The towns are Šid ([ˈʃiːd]), Novi Sad and Belgrade.

Article 10 of the Constitution of Serbia adopted by a referendum in 2006 defined Cyrillic as the official script in Serbia, while Latin was given the status of a "script in official use".

A survey from 2014 showed that 47% of the Serbian population favors the Latin alphabet whereas 36% favors Cyrillic; the remaining 17% has no preference.

Today, Serbian is more likely to be written in Latin in Montenegro than in Serbia. Exceptions to this include Serbian websites where use of Latin alphabet is often more convenient, and increasing use in tabloid and popular media such as Blic, Danas and Svet. More established media, such as the formerly state-run Politika, and Radio Television of Serbia, or foreign Google News, Voice of Russia and Facebook tend to use Cyrillic script. Some websites offer the content in both scripts, using Cyrillic as the source and auto generating Romanized version.

== Correspondence between Cyrillic and Latin alphabets ==
Each Cyrillic and Latin Serbo-Croatian letter has its exact counterpart in the other alphabet, although Latin digraphs ⟨lj⟩, ⟨nj⟩ and ⟨dž⟩ correspond to Cyrillic single letters ⟨љ⟩, ⟨њ⟩ and ⟨џ⟩, so knowledge of Serbian is sometimes required to do proper transliteration from Latin back to Cyrillic. This is because digraphs of the Gaj's Latin alphabet are usually encoded as combinations of two separate letters, although they can also be encoded as single Unicode symbols. Transliteration from Cyrillic to Latin does not pose such challenges as Cyrillic does not employ digraphs.

The following table provides the upper and lower case forms of Gaj's Latin alphabet, along with the equivalent forms in the Serbo-Croatian Cyrillic alphabet.

Cyrillic	А а	Б б	В в	Г г	Д д	Ђ ђ	Е е	Ж ж	З з	И и	Ј ј	К к	Л л	Љ љ	М м
Latin	A a	B b	V v	G g	D d	Đ đ	E e	Ž ž	Z z	I i	J j	K k	L l	Lj lj	M m

Cyrillic	Н н	Њ њ	О о	П п	Р р	С с	Т т	Ћ ћ	У у	Ф ф	Х х	Ц ц	Ч ч	Џ џ	Ш ш
Latin	N n	Nj nj	O o	P p	R r	S s	T t	Ć ć	U u	F f	H h	C c	Č č	Dž dž	Š š

=== Practical correspondence ===
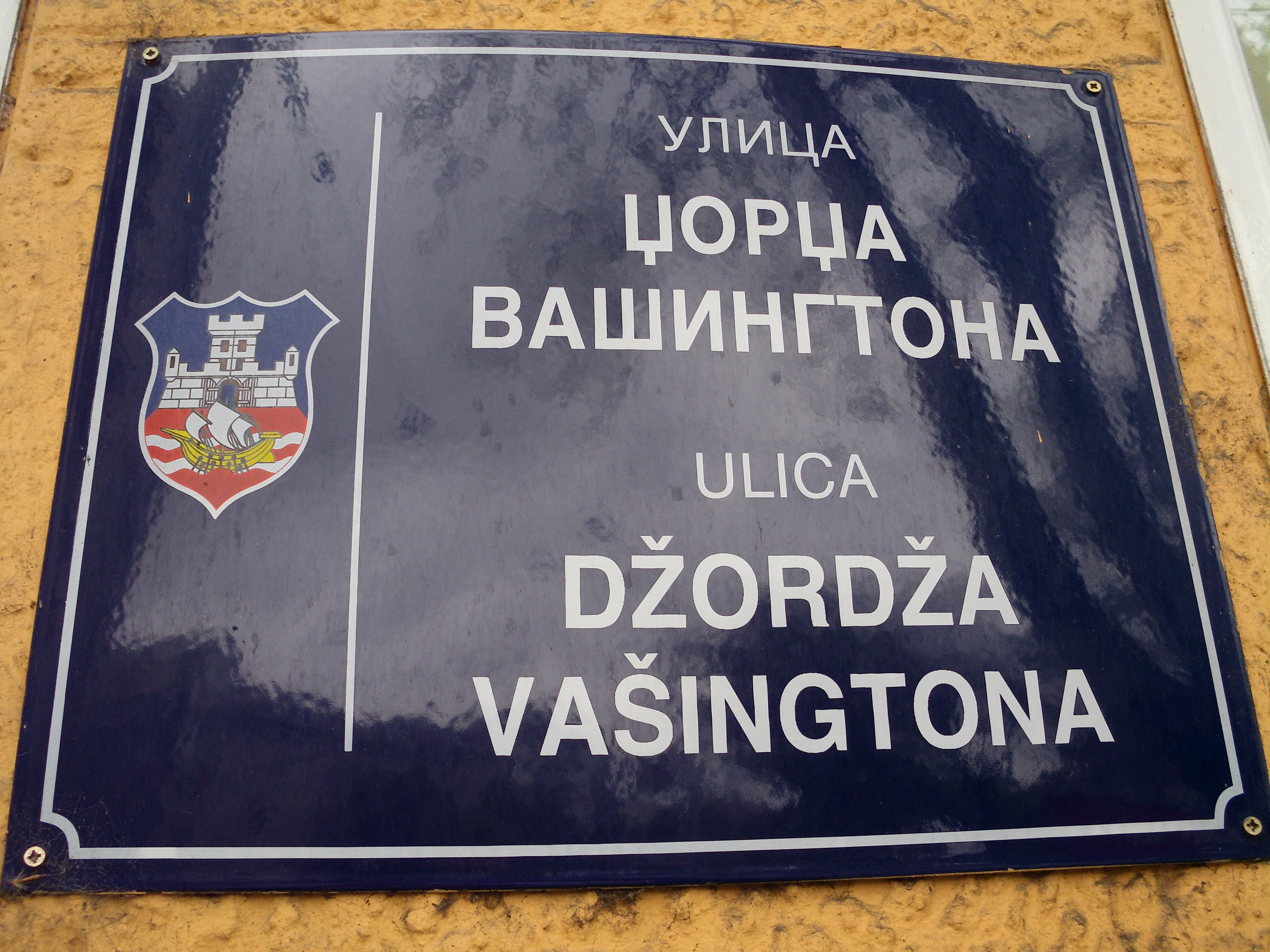
Sign of George Washington street in Belgrade

Serbian personal and place names are consistently mapped between ćirilica and latinica. A problem is presented by the letter Đ/đ that represents the affricate [dʑ] (the same sound written as ⟨j⟩ in most romanizations of Japanese, similar, though not identical to English ⟨j⟩ as in "jewel"), which is still sometimes represented by ⟨dj⟩. A transcribed "Dj" is still sometimes encountered in rendering Serbian names into English (e.g. Novak Djokovic), though strictly Đ should be used (as in Croatian). Conversely, in Serbian, foreign names are phonetically transliterated into both Latin and Cyrillic. For example, in Serbian, George Washington becomes Džordž Vašington or Џорџ Вашингтон. An exception to this are place names which are so well known as to have their own form (exonym): just as English has Vienna, Austria (and not German Wien, Österreich) so Croatian and Serbian have Beč, Austrija (Serbian Cyrillic: Беч, Аустрија).

== Computing ==
In the 1990s, there was a general confusion about the proper character encoding to use to write text in Latin Croatian on computers.

- An attempt was made to apply the 7-bit "YUSCII", later "CROSCII", which included the five letters with diacritics at the expense of five non-letter characters ([, ], {, }, @), but it was ultimately unsuccessful. Because the ASCII character @ sorts before A, this led to jokes calling it žabeceda (žaba=frog, abeceda=alphabet).
- Other short-lived vendor-specific efforts were also undertaken.
- The 8-bit ISO 8859-2 (Latin-2) standard was developed by ISO.
- MS-DOS introduced 8-bit encoding CP852 for Central European languages, disregarding the ISO standard.
- Microsoft Windows spread yet another 8-bit encoding called CP1250, which had a few letters mapped one-to-one with ISO 8859-2, but also had some mapped elsewhere.
- Apple's Macintosh Central European encoding does not include the entire Gaj's Latin alphabet. Instead, a separate codepage, called MacCroatian encoding, is used.
- EBCDIC also has a Latin-2 encoding.

The preferred character encoding for Croatian today is either the ISO 8859-2, or the Unicode encoding UTF-8 (with two bytes or 16 bits necessary to use the letters with diacritics). However, as of 2010, one can still find programs as well as databases that use CP1250, CP852 or even CROSCII.

Digraphs ⟨dž⟩, ⟨lj⟩ and ⟨nj⟩ in their upper case, title case and lower case forms have dedicated Unicode code points as shown in the table below, However, these are included chiefly for backwards compatibility with legacy encodings which kept a one-to-one correspondence with Cyrillic; modern texts use a sequence of characters.

Character sequence	Composite character	Unicode code point
DŽ	Ǆ	U+01C4
Dž	ǅ	U+01C5
dž	ǆ	U+01C6
LJ	Ǉ	U+01C7
Lj	ǈ	U+01C8
lj	ǉ	U+01C9
NJ	Ǌ	U+01CA
Nj	ǋ	U+01CB
nj	ǌ	U+01CC

It's possible to also use the English alphabet, by dropping diacritics in "č", "ć", "š" and "ž", while "đ" is then written as "dj". This is sometimes known as "ASCII Serbian". (Note: Known in Serbo-Croatian as ošišana abeceda, "shorn Latin script".) It is commonly used in SMS messages, comments on the Internet or e-mails, mainly when users do not have a Serbian keyboard installed. In ASCII Serbian, the number of used letters drops down to 22, as the letters "q", "w", "x" and "y" are not used. This leads to some ambiguity due to homographs, however, context is usually sufficient to clarify these issues.

Using such an incomplete latinica does not allow for easy transliteration back to Cyrillic without significant manual work. Google tried using a machine learning approach to solving this problem and developed an interactive text input tool that enables typing Serbian in ASCII and auto-converting to Cyrillic. However, manual typing is still required with occasional disambiguation selection from the pop-up menu.

Serbian text can be converted from Cyrillic to Latin and vice versa automatically by computer. There are add-in tools available for Microsoft Word and OpenOffice.org, as well as command line tools for Linux, MacOS and Windows.

== Usage for Slovene ==
Since the early 1840s, Gaj's alphabet was increasingly used for Slovene. In the beginning, it was most commonly used by Slovene authors who treated Slovene as a variant of Serbo-Croatian (such as Stanko Vraz), but it was later accepted by a large spectrum of Slovene-writing authors. The breakthrough came in 1845, when the Slovene conservative leader Janez Bleiweis started using Gaj's script in his journal Kmetijske in rokodelske novice ("Agricultural and Artisan News"), which was read by a wide public in the countryside. By 1850, Gaj's alphabet (known as gajica in Slovene) became the only official Slovene alphabet, replacing three other writing systems that had circulated in the Slovene Lands since the 1830s: the traditional bohoričica, named after Adam Bohorič, who codified it; the dajnčica, named after Peter Dajnko; and the metelčica, named after Franc Serafin Metelko.

The Slovene version of Gaj's alphabet differs from the Serbo-Croatian one in several ways:

- The Slovene alphabet does not have the characters ⟨ć⟩ and ⟨đ⟩; the sounds they represent do not occur in Slovene.
- In Slovene, the digraphs ⟨lj⟩ and ⟨nj⟩ are treated as two separate letters and represent separate sounds (the word polje is pronounced [ˈpóːljɛ] or [pɔˈljéː] in Slovene, as opposed to [pôʎe] in Serbo-Croatian).
- While the phoneme /dʒ/ exists in modern Slovene and is written ⟨dž⟩, it is used in only borrowed words and so ⟨d⟩ and ⟨ž⟩ are considered separate letters, not a digraph.

As in Serbo-Croatian, Slovene orthography does not make use of diacritics to mark accent in words in regular writing, but headwords in dictionaries are given with them to account for homographs. For instance, letter ⟨e⟩ can be pronounced in four ways (/eː/, /ɛ/, /ɛː/ and /ə/), and letter ⟨v⟩ in two ([ʋ] and [w], though the difference is not phonemic). Also, it does not reflect consonant voicing assimilation: compare e.g. Slovene ⟨odpad⟩ and Serbo-Croatian ⟨otpad⟩ ('junkyard', 'waste').

== Usage for Macedonian ==
Romanization of Macedonian is done according to Gaj's Latin alphabet with slight modification. Gaj's ć and đ are not used at all, with ḱ (kj) and ǵ (gj) introduced instead. The rest of the letters of the alphabet are used to represent the equivalent Cyrillic letters. Also, Macedonian uses the letter dz, which is not part of the Serbo-Croatian phonemic inventory. As per the orthography, both lj and ĺ are accepted as romanisations of љ and both nj and ń for њ. For informal purposes, like texting, most Macedonian speakers will omit the diacritics or use a digraph- and trigraph-based system for ease as there is no Macedonian Latin keyboard supported on most systems. For example, š becomes sh or s, and dž becomes dzh or dz.

== Influence on Romani alphabets ==
This alphabet influenced alphabets of Romani languages that are spoken in Southeast Europe, namely Vlax and Balkan Romani.

== Keyboard layout ==
The standard Gaj's Latin alphabet keyboard layout for personal computers is as follows:

Gaj's Latin alphabet keyboard layout

== Polling ==
Several polls have been conducted regarding the preferred writing script in Serbia. Polls ask respondents to identify the script they tend to use more.

Latin is predominant in online spaces, while official documentation favours the Cyrillic script. Citizens use both scripts equally well, which is a result of the school system. Before 2006, the introduction of Cyrillic as the sole official script, the Latin script was predominantly used, and the use of Cyrillic was considered endangered. Today's distribution is subject to change, given that surveys vary.

Year	Pollster	Result		
Year	Pollster	Cyrilic	Latin	Both
2002		21.9%	39.8%	38.3%
2011		35%	35%	25%
2014	Politika	36.2%	47.3%	16%
2018		63%	18%	18%

== See also ==
- Glagolitic alphabet
- Yugoslav braille
- Yugoslav manual alphabet

== Sources ==
- Anić, Vladimir; Silić, Josip (1987). Pravopisni priručnik hrvatskoga ili srpskoga jezika (in Croatian) (2nd ed.). Zagreb: Liber / Školska knjiga.
- Babić, Stjepan; Brozović, Dalibor; Škarić, Ivo; Težak, Stjepko (2007). Glasovi i oblici hrvatskoga književnoga jezika. Velika hrvatska gramatika. Vol. 1. Zagreb: Globus / HAZU. ISBN 978-953-167-202-3.
- Badurina, Lada; Marković, Ivan; Mićanović, Krešimir (2008). Hrvatski pravopis (2nd ed.). Zagreb: Matica hrvatska.
- Badurina, Lada (2012). "Hrvatski slovopis i pravopis u predstandardizacijskome razdoblju" (PDF). In Mićanović, Krešimir (ed.). Povijest hrvatskoga jezika / Književnost i kultura devedesetih: Zbornik radova 40. seminara Zagrebačke slavističke škole. Zagreb: Zagrebačka slavistička škola. p. 65-96. ISBN 978-953-175-431-6.
- Daničić, Đuro (1975–1976) [1878]. "Ogled". In Pavešić, Slavko; Jonke, Ljudevit (eds.). Rječnik hrvatskoga ili srpskoga jezika: Dio XXIII (2. zlotvor – žvuknuti / popis izvora, dodatak). Zagreb: JAZU.
- Halilović, Senahid (2017). Pravopis bosanskoga jezika (2nd ed.). Sarajevo: Slavistički komitet.
- Jagić, Vatroslav (1948) [1890]. "Istorija hrvatskoga pravopisa latinskim slovima. Napisao Dr. T. Maretić. U Zagrebu 1889.". Izabrani kraći spisi. Translated by Kombol, Mihovil. Zagreb: Matica hrvatska. pp. 485–491.
- Jojić, Ljiljana (2003). Pravopisni priručnik - dodatak Velikom rječniku hrvatskoga jezika (in Croatian). Zagreb: Novi liber.
- Maretić, Tomo (1889). Istorija hrvatskoga pravopisa latinskijem slovima (PDF). Zagreb: JAZU.
- Maretić, Tomo (1963) [1899]. Gramatika hrvatskoga ili srpskoga književnog jezika (3rd ed.). Zagreb: Matica hrvatska.
- Moguš, Milan; Vončina, Josip (1969). "Latinica u Hrvata". Radovi Zavoda za slavensku filologiju. 11. Zagreb: Sveučilište u Zagrebu, Filozofski fakultet: 61–81.
- Moguš, Milan (2009). Povijest hrvatskoga književnoga jezika (3rd ed.). Zagreb: Globus.
- Пешикан, Митар; Јерковић, Јован; Пижурица, Мато (2010). Правопис српскога језика. Нови Сад: Матица српска.
- Пипер, Предраг; Клајн, Иван; Драгичевић, Рајна (2022) [2013]. Нормативна граматика српског језика (4th ed.). Нови Сад: Матица српска. ISBN 978-86-7946-377-7.
- Vončina, Josip (1985). "Temelji i putovi Gajeve grafijske reforme". Filologija. 13. Zagreb: JAZU: 7–88.
- Žagarová, Margita; Pintarić, Ana (July 1998). "O nekim sličnostima i razlikama između hrvatskoga i slovačkoga jezika" [On some similarities and differences between Croatian and Slovak]. Jezikoslovlje (in Croatian). 1 (1). Filozofski fakultet u Osijeku: 129–134. ISSN 1331-7202.
