= Vertically barred O =

Latin letter variant

Usage
- Writing system: Latin script
- Type: Alphabetic
- Language of origin: Metelko alphabet Unifon
- Sound values: [ɔ]; [o]; [ʊ]

Other
- Writing direction: Left to right

Vertically barred O (capital: ⟨⟩, lowercase: ⟨⟩) is an additional letter of the Latin alphabet used in the Metelko alphabet in the 19th century and in Unifon to represent vowel sounds.

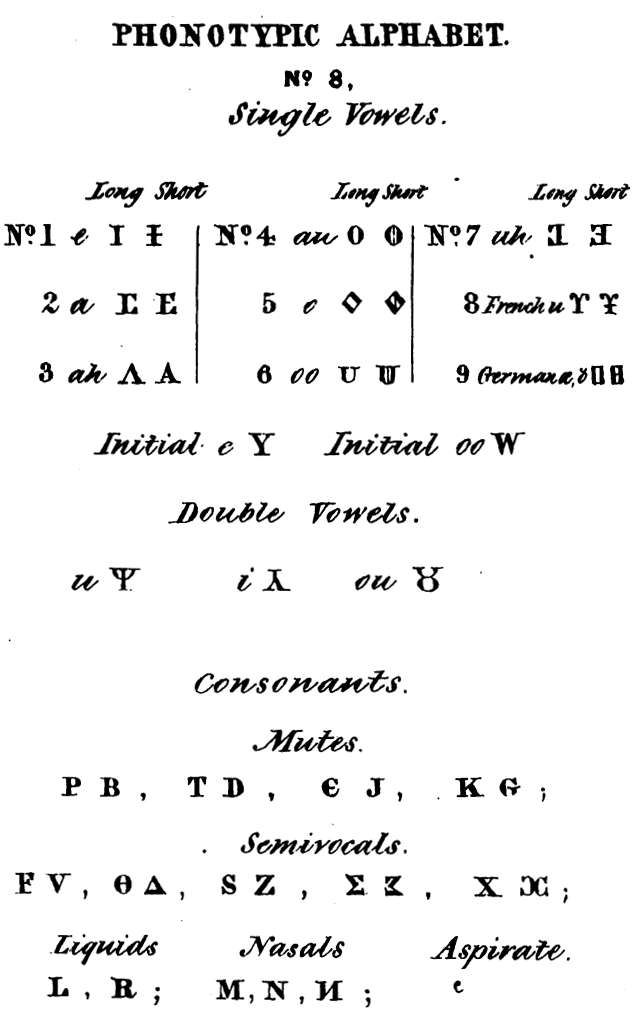
Phonotypic alphabet No. 8 of September 1843 with a vertically crossed letter ⟨O⟩

The letter is not to be confused with the slashed zero, slashed ⟨O⟩ (Ø ø), the Greek phi ⟨Φ⟩, ⟨φ⟩, the Cyrillic letter ef ⟨Ф⟩ ⟨ф⟩, the Tifinagh letter yah ⟨ⵀ⟩, the IPA symbol ⟨ɸ⟩ or the mathematical symbol ⟨⊘⟩, despite their similar shapes.

== Usage ==
It was the 20th letter of the Metelko alphabet, used to represent the sound [ɔ].

In Unifon, it is used to represent the sound [o]. It is included in the variants for English (the 23rd letter of the alphabet), Hupa (No. 20), Karuk (No. 16), Tolowa (No. 20), and Yurok (No. 18), and in variants of the Shaw-Malone Forty-Phoneme Alphabet (No. 24) and the Indian Unifon Single-Sound Alphabet (No. 26). As with the other letters, only the uppercase form is used, for the sound ⟨ʊ⟩.

Isaac Pitman used the vertically barred ⟨o⟩ in a trial version of the phonotypic alphabet in 1843. The letter has also appeared in various linguistic and phonetic studies as a way to distinguish vowel qualities, and in typographic experiments where visually modified Latin letters are used for additional sounds.

== Computer representation ==
The vertically barred ⟨o⟩ has not been added to a standard Unicode encoding. Existing characters may appear similar but are only glyph variants.

The character is visually similar to the Deseret letter long oo ⟨𐐅𐐭⟩ and the Tifinagh letter yah ⟨ⵀ⟩.

== See also ==
- O
- Slashed O
- Barred O
- List of Latin-script letters
