= Dajnko alphabet =

Former alphabet for the Slovene language

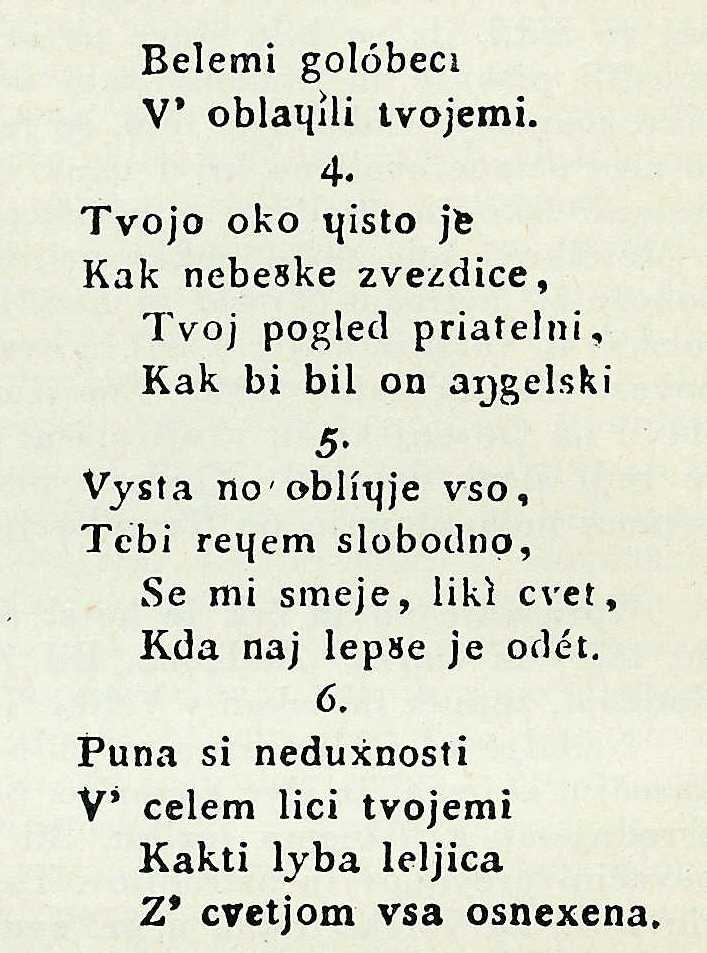
A poem by Dajnko in the Dajnko alphabet

The Dajnko alphabet (Slovene: dajnčica) was a Slovene alphabet invented by Peter Dajnko. It was used from 1824 to 1839 mostly in Styria (in what is now eastern Slovenia).

== History ==
Dajnko introduced his alphabet in 1824 in his book Lehrbuch der windischen Sprache (Slovene Textbook). He decided to replace the older Bohorič alphabet with his own new writing system because of the problems with the writing of sibilants. In 1825, Franc Serafin Metelko came up with a similar proposal, complicating the issue. The Dajnko alphabet, which was introduced to schools in 1831, was fiercely opposed by Anton Murko and Anton Martin Slomšek. After 1834 it gradually came out of use with the adoption of a slightly modified version of Gaj's Latin alphabet as the new Slovene script and was in 1839 officially abolished.

== Letters ==
He represented the phonemes /ts/, /s/, /z/ with the letters C, S, Z (as in the modern Slovene alphabet) and the phonemes /tʃ/, /ʃ/, /ʒ/ with special characters (see table below). In addition, he invented two extra symbols, which were omitted after 1829 (see table below):

Dajnčica
Upper case	Lower case	IPA	Modern Slovene
C	c	/t͡s/	c
Ч	ɥ	/t͡ʃ/	č
S	s	/s/	s
Ȣ	ȣ	/ʃ/	š
Z	z	/z/	z
X	x	/ʒ/	ž
Ŋ	ŋ	/n̪ʲ/	nj
Y	y	/y/	ü (in eastern dialects only)

Dajnko's alphabetical order was as follows:

A B C D E F G H I J K L M N Ŋ O P R S Ȣ Z X T U Y V Ч

The IETF language tags have assigned the variant sl-dajnko to Slovene in the Dajnko alphabet.
