= Peter Dajnko =

Slovene priest and author

- Born: 23 April 1787; Črešnjevci, Styria, Austria (now Slovenia)
- Died: 22 February 1873 (aged 85); Velika Nedelja, Styria, Austria-Hungary (now Slovenia)
- Occupations: Slovene priest, author, linguist, beekeeper
- Known for: Inventor of the Dajnko alphabet Writer of the first book about beekeeping in Slovene

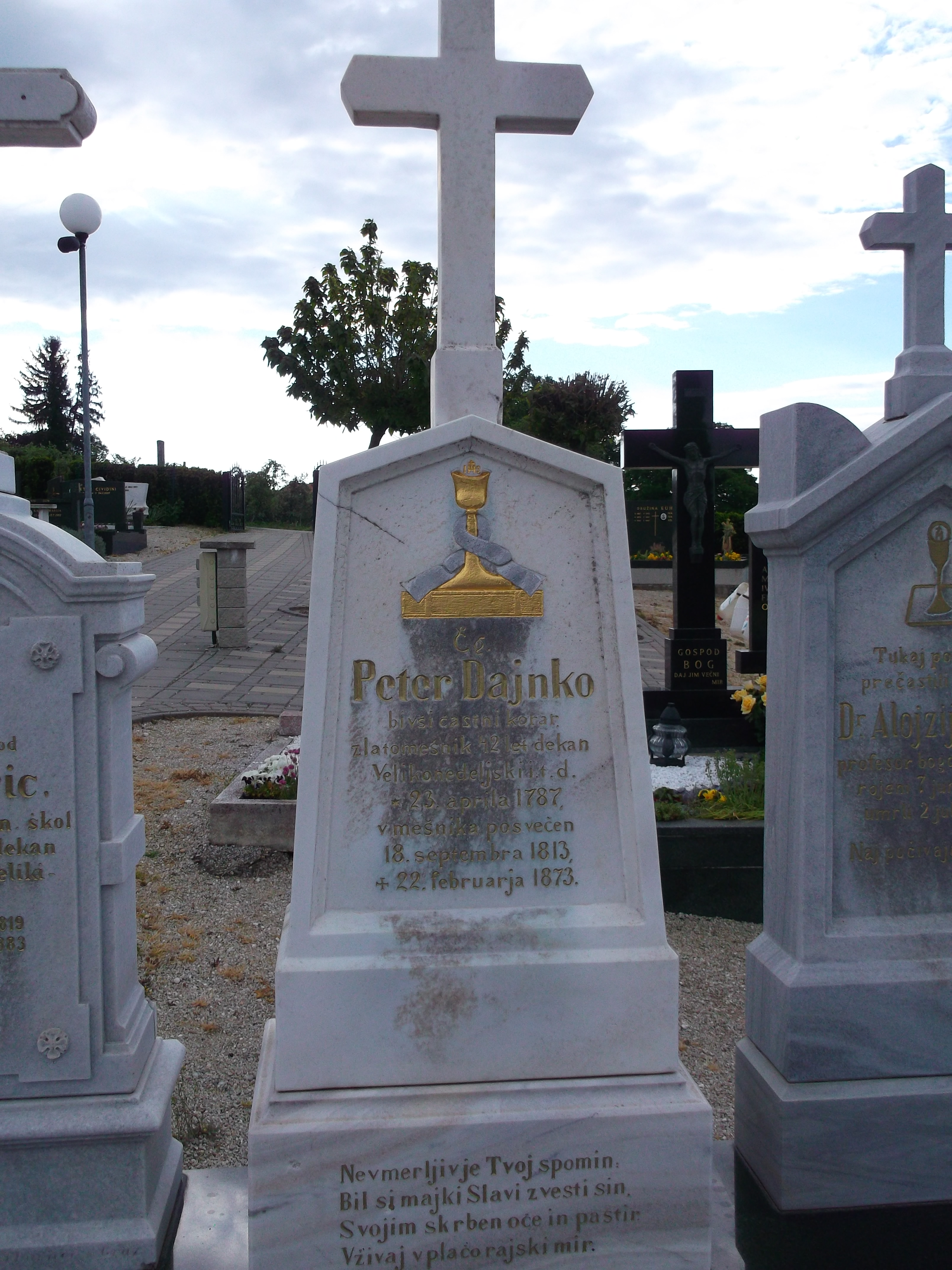
Dajnko's grave in the Velika Nedelja Cemetery.

Peter Dajnko (23 April 1787 – 22 February 1873) was a Slovene priest, author, and linguist, known primarily as the inventor of the Dajnko alphabet (Slovene: dajnčica), an innovative proposal for the Slovene alphabet. Dajnko was also a proficient beekeeper and wrote the first book about beekeeping in Slovene, titled Čelarstvo (Beekeeping).

== Life ==
Dajnko was born in the village of Črešnjevci near the town of Gornja Radgona, in what was then the Duchy of Styria in Archduchy of Austria as part of Habsburg monarchy. His parents was Filip Dajnko (Dainko) winegrower and Marija Korošec. After finishing high school in Maribor, he studied theology and philosophy at the University of Graz, where he graduated in 1814. He returned to Gornja Radgona, where he was a chaplain until 1831, when he moved to Velika Nedelja to be the parish priest. He died in Velika Nedelja.

== Work ==
In 1824 Dajnko wrote a book in German called Lehrbuch der windischen Sprache ("The Textbook of the Slovene Language"). There, he proposed adoption of a new alphabet for Slovene, which was to replace the traditional Bohorič alphabet, used since the late-16th century. Dajnko wanted to improve the script because of its problems with writing of sibilants. He used his alphabet in all his books published since 1824. In 1825, Franc Serafin Metelko came up with a similar proposal, complicating the issue. The Dajnko alphabet, which was introduced to schools in 1831, was fiercely opposed by Anton Murko and Anton Martin Slomšek. After 1834 it gradually came out of use with the adoption of a slightly modified version of Gaj's Latin alphabet as the new Slovene script, and in 1839 it was officially abolished.

== Works ==
- Sazhetek vüzhenja 'Slaven'skega po nedelah (Beginning of the Slavic Teaching on Sundays), 1816
- Evangeliomi na v'se nedéle ino 'svetke skos leto (Gospels for All Sundays and Holidays throughout the Year), 1817
- Knishiza poboshnosti sa mlade ino dorashene kristjane (Little Book of Devotions for Young and Adult Christians), 1820
- Svetega pisma sgodbe is starega ino novega sakona (Stories from the Old and New Testament of the Holy Bible), 1821
- Lehrbuch der Windischen Sprache (Slovene Textbook), 1824
- Kmet Izidor s svojimi otroki ino lydmi (Isidore the Peasant, His Children and People), 1824
- Sto cirkvenih ino drügih poboxnih pesmi med katolȣkimi kristjani slovenskega naroda na Ȣtajerskem (A Hundred Church and Other Devotional Hymns of the Catholic Christians of the Slovene Nation in Styria), 1826
- Listi ino evaŋgelji (Epistles and Gospels), 1826
- Svetega Pisma zgodbe iz Starega ino Novega Zakona (Stories from the Old and New Testament of the Holy Bible), 1826
- Posvetne pesmi med slovenskim narodom na Ȣtajerskem (Secular Hymns of the Slovene Nation in Styria), 1827
- Molitbe za katolȣke kerȣenike (Prayer for Catholic Christians), 1829
- Opravilo svete meȣe (Ceremony of the Holy Mass), 1829
- Sveti krixni pot (Stations of the Holy Cross), 1829
- Boxja sluxba kerȣanske mladosti (Divine Service of the Christian Youth), 1830
- Zhelarstvo (Beekeeping), 1831
- Чelarstvo (Beekeeping), 1831
- Knixica poboxnosti za mlade ino doraȣene kristjane (Small Book of Devotions for Young and Adult Christians), 1833
- Abecedna knixica za dexelne ȣole (Primer for Provincial Schools), 1833
- Abecedna knixica na hitro ino lehko podvuчenje (Primer for Fast and Easy Learning), 1833
- Veliki katekizem (Greater Catechism), 1833
