= Črešnjevci =

- Village
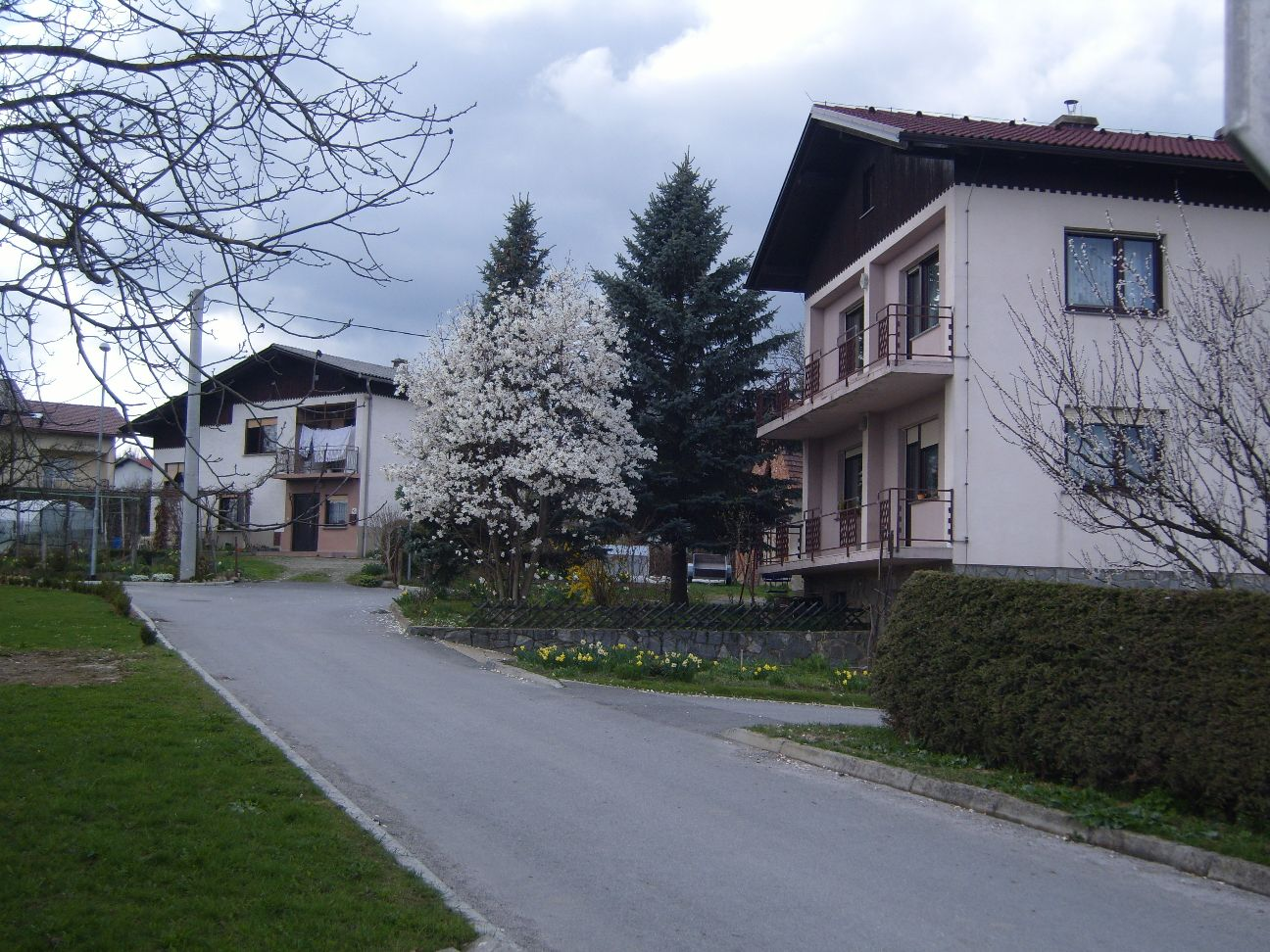

- Location in Slovenia
- Coordinates: 46°39′19.78″N 15°59′48.54″E
- Country: Slovenia
- Traditional region: Styria
- Statistical region: Mura
- Municipality: Gornja Radgona

Area
  - Total: 4.79 km^{2} (1.85 sq mi)
- Elevation: 226.7 m (744 ft)

Population (2020)
  - Total: 741
  - Density: 155/km^{2} (401/sq mi)

Črešnjevci (pronounced [ˈtʃɾeːʃnjɛu̯tsi], in older sources Črešnjovci, German: Kerschbach) is a dispersed settlement immediately south of Gornja Radgona in northeastern Slovenia.

The Slovene author, linguist and beekeeper Peter Dajnko was born in the village in 1787. The house in which he was born is a simple thatched farmhouse and now houses an ethnographic collection.
