= Jurij Dalmatin =

Carniolan minister and translator

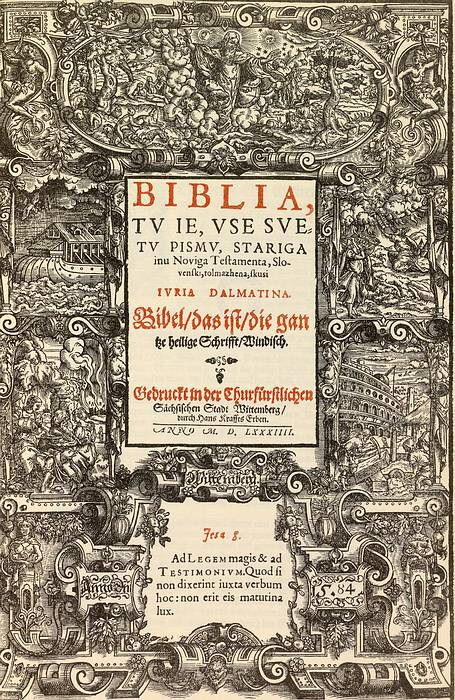
Dalmatin's Bible

Jurij Dalmatin (c. 1547 – 31 August 1589) was a Slovene Lutheran minister, reformer, writer, and translator. He translated the complete Bible into Slovene.

== Life ==
Born in Krško, Dalmatin came from a Dalmatian family. Until the age of 18, he studied under the Protestant teacher and grammarian Adam Bohorič. Dalmatin next studied in Württemberg and Bebenhausen north of Tübingen. In August 1566 he entered the University of Tübingen, becoming a baccalarius in March 1569 and a magister in August 1569. He published his magisterial work De catholica et catholicis disputatio in 1572. These German studies were funded by Bohorič and the Protestant reformer Primož Trubar. Dalmatin became a preacher in Ljubljana in 1572.

He had a wife named Barbara, with whom he had four children: Janez, Katarina, Elizabeta, and Marko.

He died in Ljubljana in 1589.

== Work ==
Dalmatin was the author of several religious books, such as Karšanske lepe molitve (Beautiful Christian Prayers, 1584), Ta kratki würtemberški katekizmus (The Short Württemberg Catechism, 1585), and Agenda (1589). However, his most important achievement is the complete translation of the Bible into Slovene, which he allegedly wrote to a large extent at Turjak Castle under the protection of the Carniolan governor, Herbard VIII von Auersperg (Slovene: Hervard Turjaški), and Herbard's son Christoph von Auersperg, who are said to have provided for the translator Dalmatin a "Wartburg"-type sanctuary as had been offered to Martin Luther by Frederick the Wise, the Elector of Saxony. This, however, is refuted as pure legend.

The original title of Dalmatin's translation was Bibilija, tu je vse svetu pismu stariga inu noviga testamenta, slovenski tolmačena skuzi Jurija Dalmatina (The Bible: That Is, the Entire Holy Scripture of the Old and the New Testament, Translated into Slovene by Jurij Dalmatin), and it was published in 1583, printed in the Bohorič alphabet. The translation set the norm for the Slovene standard language (with later innovations in vocabulary) until the first half of the 19th century.

== See also ==
- Adam Bohorič
- Sebastian Krelj
- Primož Trubar
