= Rajmund Zamanja =

Croatian theologian, philosopher and linguist

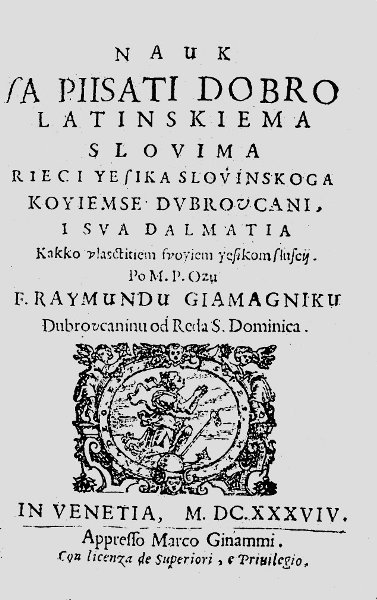
- Born: 1587; Dubrovnik, Republic of Ragusa
- Died: March 1647 (aged 59–60); Dubrovnik, Republic of Ragusa
- Known for: Croatian orthography

Rajmund Zamanja (Džamanjić) (1587 in Dubrovnik – March 1647 in Dubrovnik) or Raymundo Giamagnik was a Croatian theologian, philosopher and linguist from Dubrovnik.

== Biography ==
He was born in Dubrovnik in 1587. He joined the Dominicans in 1601 from which he learned philosophy and theology. Four years later, in 1605, he went to the end of the study in Bologna. In 1612 he returned to Dubrovnik as a lecturer. Three times he was a general vicar of the Dominicans. Fourteen years later, in 1626, he established the first public gymnasium on the ground floor of the Dominican monastery (in 1685 it was taken over by the Jesuits). There he was a teacher and he emphasized the importance of learning Croatian.

He is the author of the first orthography of Croatian, which was intended for students of the gymnasium. In 1639 he published a language discussion Nauk za piisati dobro latinskiema slovima rieci yezika slovinskoga koyiemse Dubrovcani, i sva Dalmatia kakko vlasctitiem svoyiem yezikom sluzci, where he proposed a simple and consistent consonant writing system: double letters only write voices ć, đ, lj, nj, š and ž, but also the complicated use of accent marks. His letter suggestions did not survive in practice.

== Bibliography ==
- Erdmann, Elisabeth von. 1991. Nauk za pisati dobro : 1639; Rajmund Džamanjić. Bamberg.

== See also ==
- Croatian language
- People from Dubrovnik
