= Adam Bohorič =

Slovene protestant preacher and teacher

Arcticae horulae succisivae

Adam Bohorič (c. 1520 – after 20 November 1598) was a Slovene Protestant preacher, teacher and author of the first grammar of Slovene.

Bohorič was born in the market town of Reichenburg in the Duchy of Styria (now Brestanica in Slovenia). He studied in Wittenberg under the supervision of Philip Melanchthon. In 1584, he wrote his most notable work, Arcticae horulae succisivae (English: Free Winter Hours). The book, written in Latin, was the first grammar of Slovene and the first Slovene normative guide. It was adapted and republished as Grammatica latino-germanico-slavonica in 1715 by Joannes Adamus Gaiger. In this work, Bohorič codified the first Slovene alphabet, now called the Bohorič alphabet. It was used up to the 1840s, when it was replaced by Gaj's Latin alphabet.

== See also ==
- Primož Trubar
- Jurij Dalmatin
- Sebastian Krelj
