= Joannes Adamus Gaiger =

- Born: c. 1667; Novo Mesto
- Died: April 28, 1722; Kranj
- Other names: Hypolythus Neostadiensis; Hippolytus Rudolphswertensis
- Occupations: philologist, religious writer, lexicographer
- Notable work: Dictionarium trilingue

Joannes Adamus Gaiger (Slovenized: Janez Adam Gaiger, c. 1667 – April 28, 1722; monastic name Hypolythus Neostadiensis or Hippolytus Rudolphswertensis 'Hippolytus of Novo Mesto', Slovenized: Hipolit Novomeški) (Note: The Slovenized monastic name Hipolit Novomeški appears in print by 1876. An earlier Slovenization, Hipolit iz Novega mesta, appeared in print in 1857. The Slovenized given name Janez Adam appears in 1951.) was a Slovene philologist, religious writer, lexicographer, translator, and Capuchin.

Gaiger's 1715 edition of Evangelia inu lystuvi (1730 reprint)

Gaiger was born in Novo Mesto circa 1667. After studying with the Jesuits in Ljubljana, he joined the Capuchin order in 1684. He taught philosophy at monasteries in Maribor and Graz, and then theology in the Ljubljana area. In 1712 he published his Dictionarium trilingue, a trilingual dictionary of Latin, German, and Slovene. In 1715 he published a revised edition of Adam Bohorič's grammar Grammatica latino-germanico-slavonica (Latin–German–Slovene Grammar), and that same year a third edition of the 1613 work Evangelia inu lystuvi (Gospels and Epistles). Gaiger died in Kranj in 1722.
