= Franc Serafin Metelko =

Slovene priest and author

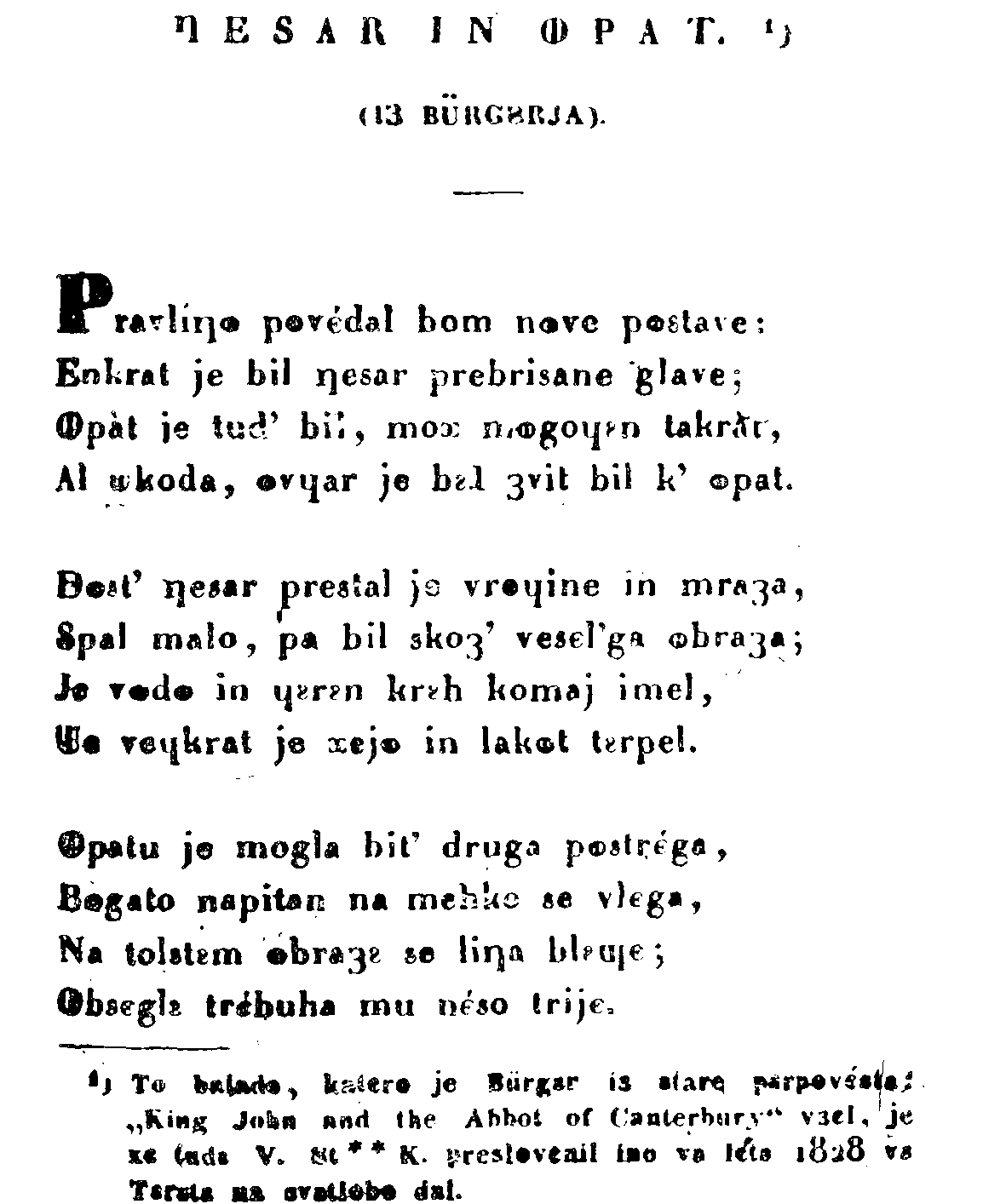
Example of Metelko's proposed script: Valentin Stanič's adaptation of the poem "Der Kaiser und der Abt" by Gottfried August Bürger

Franc Serafin Metelko, also known as Fran Metelko (14 July 1789 – 27 December 1860) was a Slovene Roman Catholic priest, author, and philologist, best known for his proposal of a new script for the Slovene called the Metelko alphabet, which was meant to replace the traditional Bohorič alphabet, used since the late sixteenth century.

Metelko was born in the hamlet of Vrh in the village of Škocjan in Lower Carniola, then part of the Habsburg monarchy. The son of Mathias Metelko and Appolonia (née Kerßnik) Metelko, he was baptized Franz Metelko. He studied theology and philosophy in Ljubljana. In 1814 he was ordained a priest and in 1817 he started teaching Slovene at the Lyceum in Ljubljana.

In 1825, he published a book in German titled Lehrgebäude der slowenischen Sprache im Königreiche Illyrien und in den benachbarten Provinzen (Slovenian Textbook for the Kingdom of Illyria and Neighboring Provinces). Following the advice of the linguist Jernej Kopitar, his newly created alphabet (which soon became known as the metelčica 'Metelko alphabet') was phonetic, with each character corresponding a sound in the spoken language. It was also quite complicated, containing unneeded or redundant characters for glottal h and the clusters lj, nj, and šč as well as unfamiliar characters taken from Cyrillic. In addition, Metelko based his phonology on his local Lower Carniolan dialect, which was not acceptable for most contemporary Slovenian authors.

Metelko's proposal further aggravated the "Slovene alphabet War", which was started by Peter Dajnko's quest for a new, more phonetic alphabet, replacing the traditional Bohorič alphabet (bohoričica). Metelko's main opponent, the philologist Matija Čop, convinced the Czech scholar František Čelakovský to publish a devastating critique of Metelko's alphabet, which undermined the chances of its success. Čop also persuaded the local Austrian educational authorities to ban Metelko's alphabet from schools, which they did with an official decree in 1833. The Alphabet War nevertheless continued until the 1840s, when a slightly modified version of Gaj's Latin alphabet was finally adopted, which is still used to this day.

Metelko's alphabet remained in public memory because of a satirical poem by France Prešeren titled "Al' prav se piše kaa ali kaſha" (How to Write the Word Porridge), which criticized the Alphabet War as nonsense.

Metelko was also a collector of folk songs and an amateur poet. Metelko Street (Metelkova ulica), home to the Metelkova autonomous social and cultural centre in the center of Ljubljana, is named after him.

He died in Ljubljana.

== See also ==
- Language reform
