= Sebastian Krelj =

Slovene writer and academic

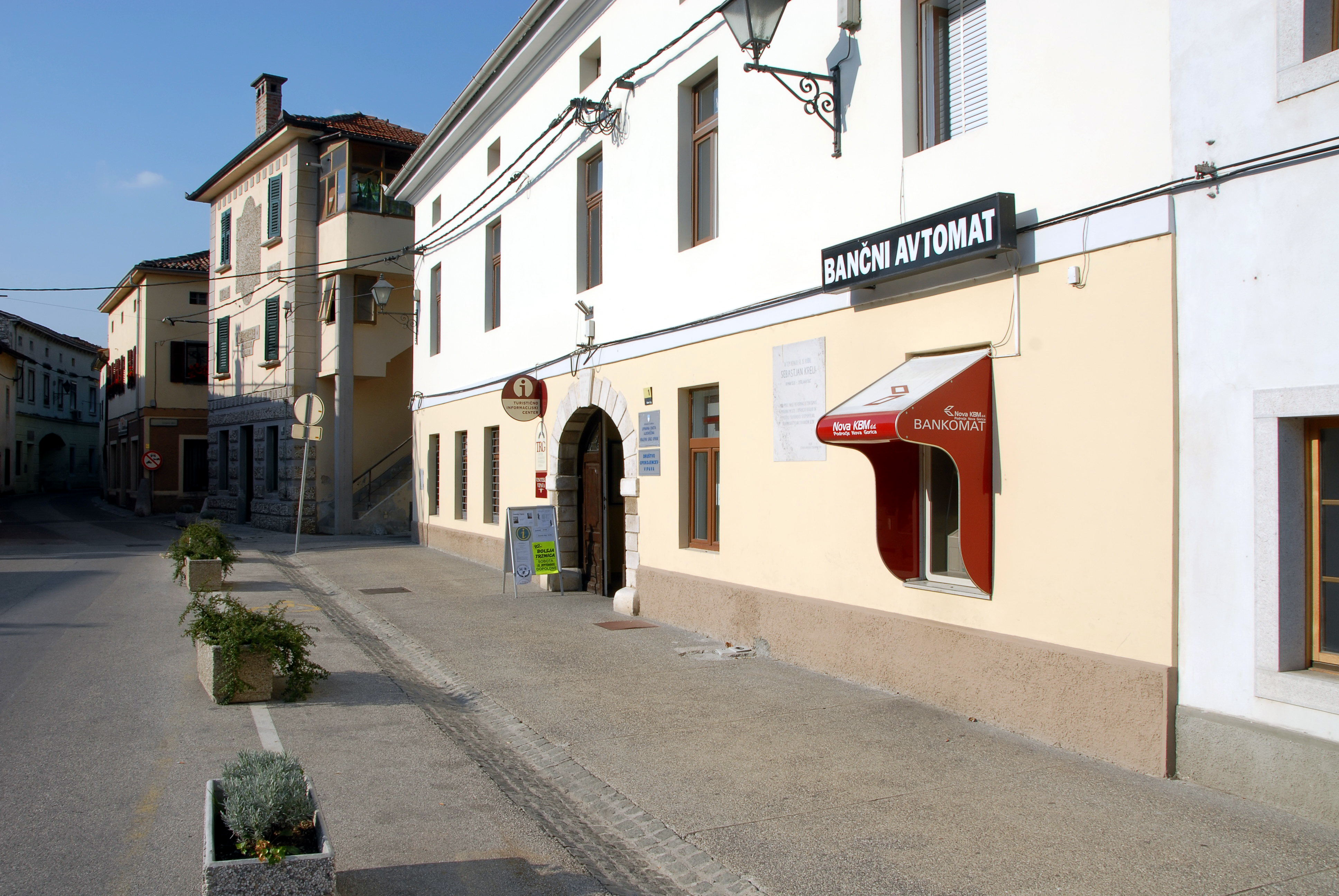
Birthplace of Sebastian Krelj in Vipava

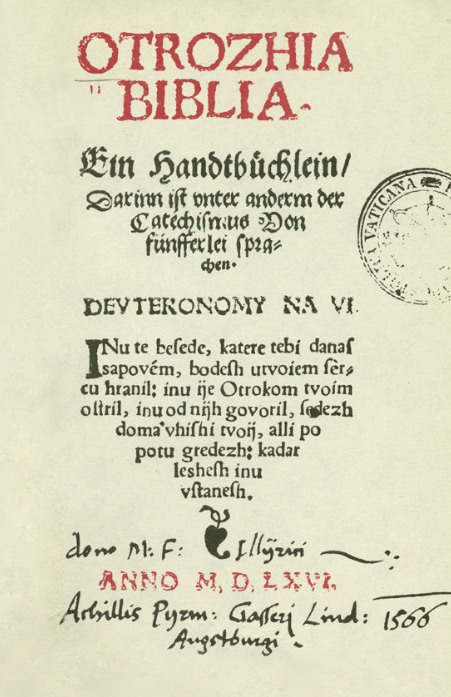
Otročja biblija, 1566

Sebastian Krelj, also known as Sebastjan Krelj, Sebastijan Krelj or Boštjan Krelj (1538 – 25 December 1567) was a Slovene Protestant reformer, writer, pastor, linguist and preacher and regarded as one of the most educated Slovene Protestants of the 16th century.

== Life and work ==
Krelj was born in Vipava, then part of the Duchy of Carniola. He studied at University of Jena and became a follower of the Lutheran preacher and writer Primož Trubar, the leader of the Protestant Reformation in the Slovene Lands, whom he assisted as a preacher in Ljubljana. In 1565, he became superintendent of the Carniolan Protestant Church in Ljubljana. Already at the time of assuming the position, he was suffering from tuberculosis and on Christmas two years later died from it, leaving behind a widow and a child.

Krelj had a wide linguistic and philologic knowledge: besides Slovene, German and Latin, he knew Ancient Greek, Hebrew, Croatian and Glagolitic literature. Krelj put the central dialect into context of dialects spoken by Istrians, the inhabitants of the Vipava Valley and Lower Carniolans. He introduced some changes to the Latin script originally adopted by Trubar from the German. He consistently differentiated the phonemes /s/ /z/ /t͡s/ /ʃ/ /ʒ/ /t͡ʃ/ /t͡ɕ/ /ə/ (written by Krelj as ſ s z ſh sh zh ch à/è, modern orthography s z c š ž č ć e). His reforms were taken up by Jurij Dalmatin in the first translation of the entire Bible to the Slovene. In 1583, they were codified by Adam Bohorič in his grammar book Arcticae horulae succisivae.
