= Ivo Škarić =

Croatian expert in rhetoric

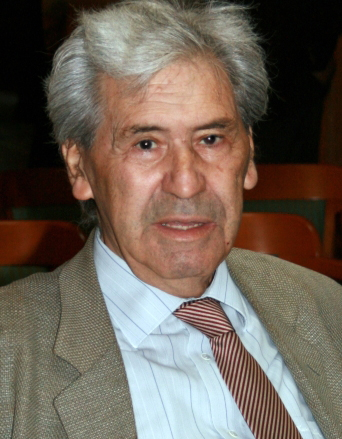
Ivo Škarić

Ivo Škarić (1933–2009) was a leading Croatian expert in rhetoric and a founder of the Department of Phonetics at the Faculty of Philosophy in Zagreb, Croatia.

Škarić was the editor-in-chief of the journal Govor, a member of the editorial board of the Media Research Journal and the chief organizer of the scientific research group “Speech Research.”

In 2013, the International Conference on Rhetoric was founded in Croatia and named the "Days of Ivo Škarić". This conference is held biennially for experts in rhetoric.

Škarić published more than 150 scientific papers in phonetic sciences and three books in the field of rhetoric. He received the State Award "Bartol Kašić" for scientific research in 1992 and the Ivan Filipović Award for Lifetime Achievement in 2007.
