= Matija Čop =

Slovene linguist

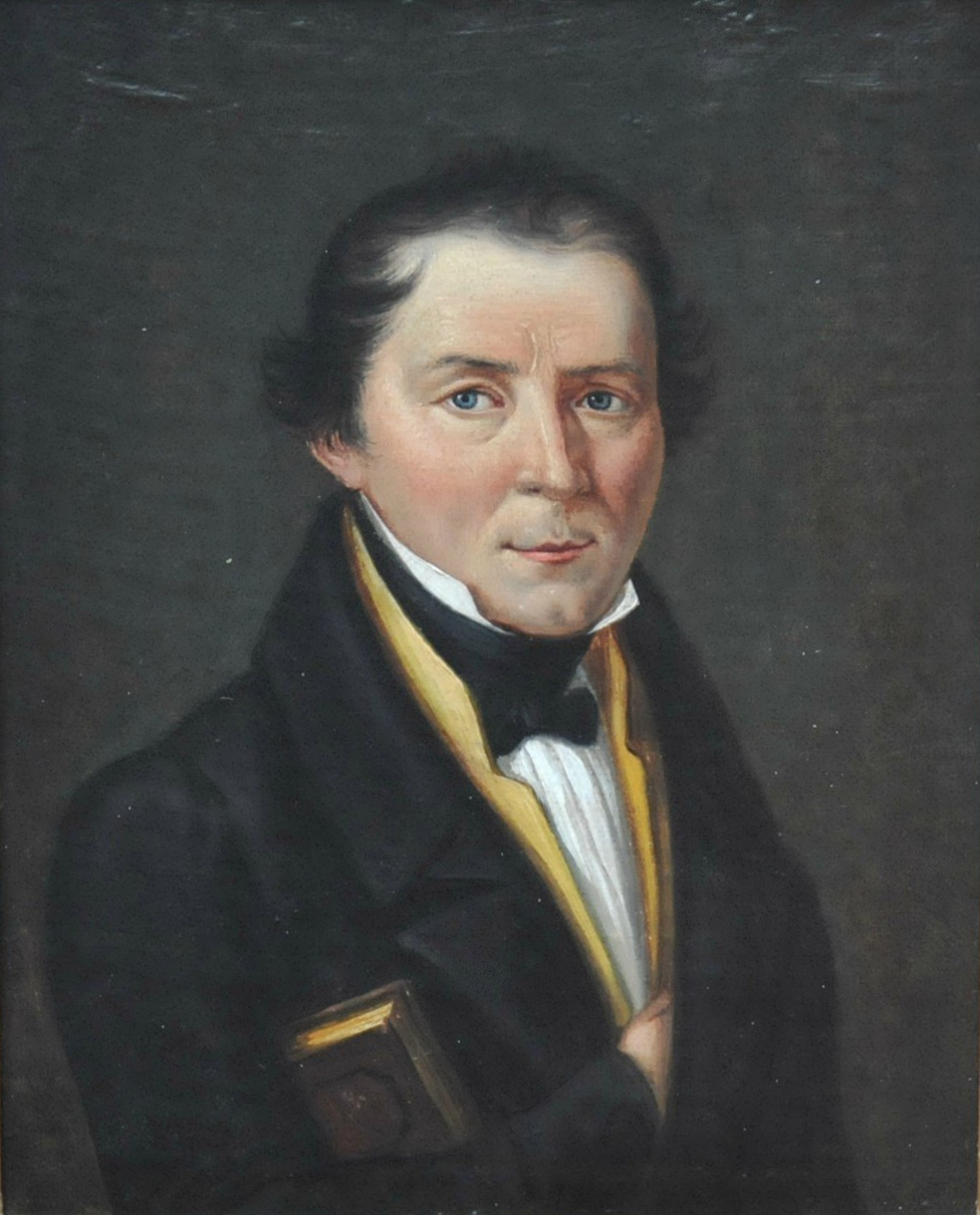
Matija Čop

Matija Čop (pronounced [maˈtiːja ˈtʃɔp]; 26 January 1797 – 6 July 1835), also known in German as Matthias Tschop, was a Slovene linguist, polyglot, literary historian and critic.

== Biography ==
Čop was born in the small northern Carniolan town of Žirovnica, in what was then the Habsburg monarchy (now in Slovenia), into a relatively wealthy peasant family. He was sent to Ljubljana for primary and secondary schooling and then studied philosophy at the lyceums of Ljubljana and Vienna for three years. In 1817, he returned from Vienna and attended a priest seminary until 1820, when he left it to become a secondary school teacher in Rijeka, Croatia. In 1822 he moved to Lviv (then also part of the Austrian Empire), when he started working as a teacher at the local lyceum, but was soon promoted to assistant professor at Lviv University.

In 1827 he returned to Ljubljana, when he was offered a job as a secondary school teacher again. In 1828, he accepted the post of librarian at the Lyceum, which he held full-time after 1831.

During his time in Ljubljana, he became a close friend of the poet France Prešeren. He served as his tutor, providing him with information on contemporary developments in European literature.

In 1835, at age 38, Čop drowned while swimming in the Sava River. Prešeren dedicated his major poem The Baptism on the Savica to his late friend.

Prior to his death, he was engaged to the noblewoman Antonija Höffern.

== Influence ==
With his command of 19 languages (including Albanian), Čop was perhaps the most erudite Slovene of his time. Although he did not publish much original work during his lifetime, Čop had a great influence on the later development of Slovene culture. Unlike such contemporaries as the linguist Jernej Kopitar and the poet Stanko Vraz, Čop believed in the possibility of the development of a distinctive Slovenian national culture. He can thus be seen as the predecessor of the Slovenian national awakening in the second part of the 19th century. His broad cosmopolitan education enabled him to recognise the poetic talent of France Prešeren, which remained unnoticed by most of his contemporaries, and to advise him on stylistic and linguistic issues.

Today, Čop is generally regarded as one of the most important Slovenian intellectuals of the 19th century. Several streets, schools and other institutions throughout Slovenia bear his name, among them the fashionable Čop Street in Ljubljana.

== See also ==
- Franc Serafin Metelko
- Peter Dajnko
- Romantic nationalism

== Sources ==
- Fedora Ferluga Petronio, Jernej Kopitar - Matija Čop. Ljubljana: Filozofska fakulteta, 1996.
- Janko Kos, Matija Čop. Ljubljana: Partizanska knjiga, 1979.
