= Metelko alphabet =

Slovene writing system

The Metelko alphabet (Slovene: metelčica) was a Slovene writing system developed by Franc Serafin Metelko. It was used by a small group of authors from 1825 to 1833 but it was never generally accepted.

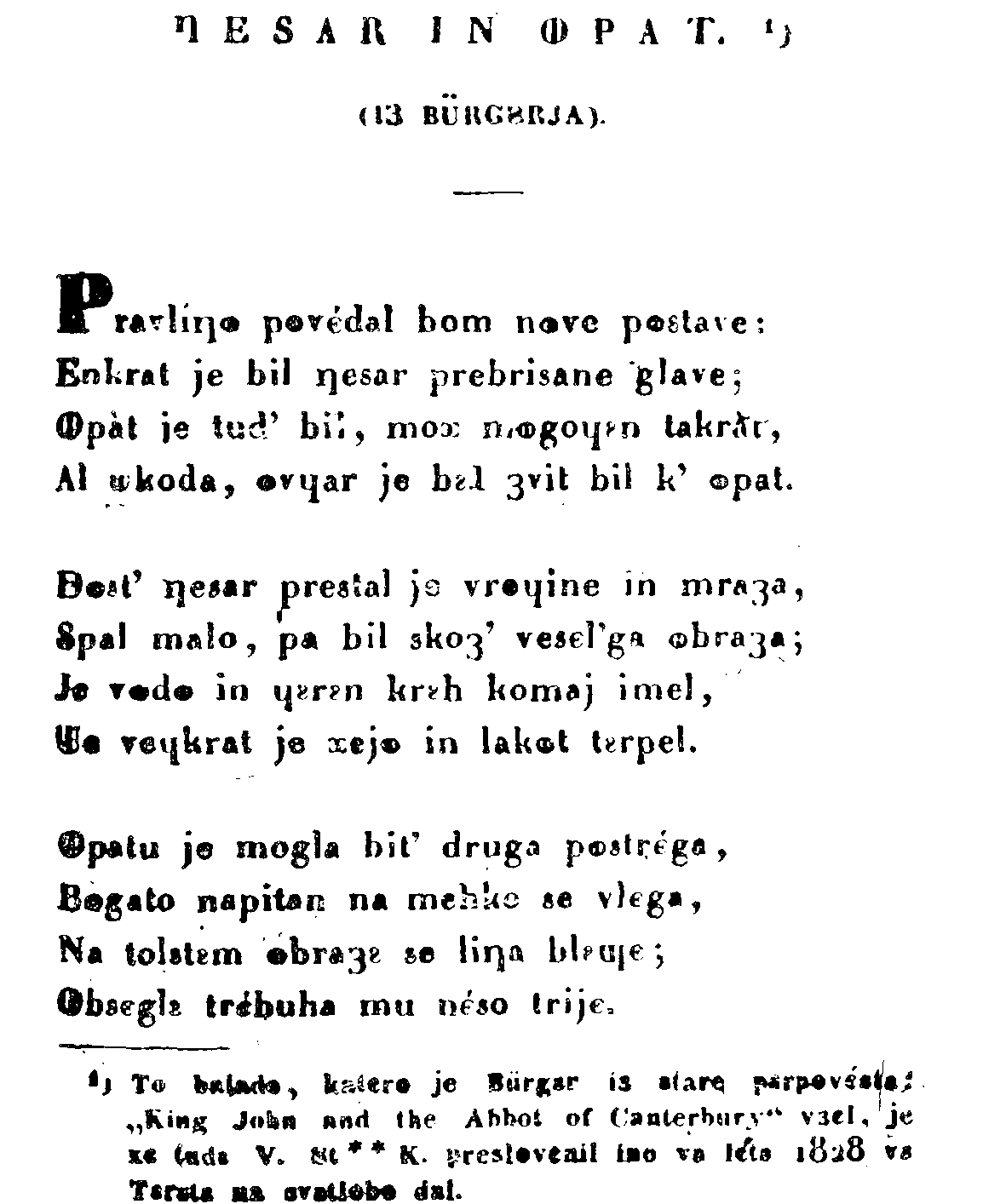
Example of the Metelko alphabet: Valentin Stanič's adaptation of the poem "Der Kaiser und der Abt" by Gottfried August Bürger

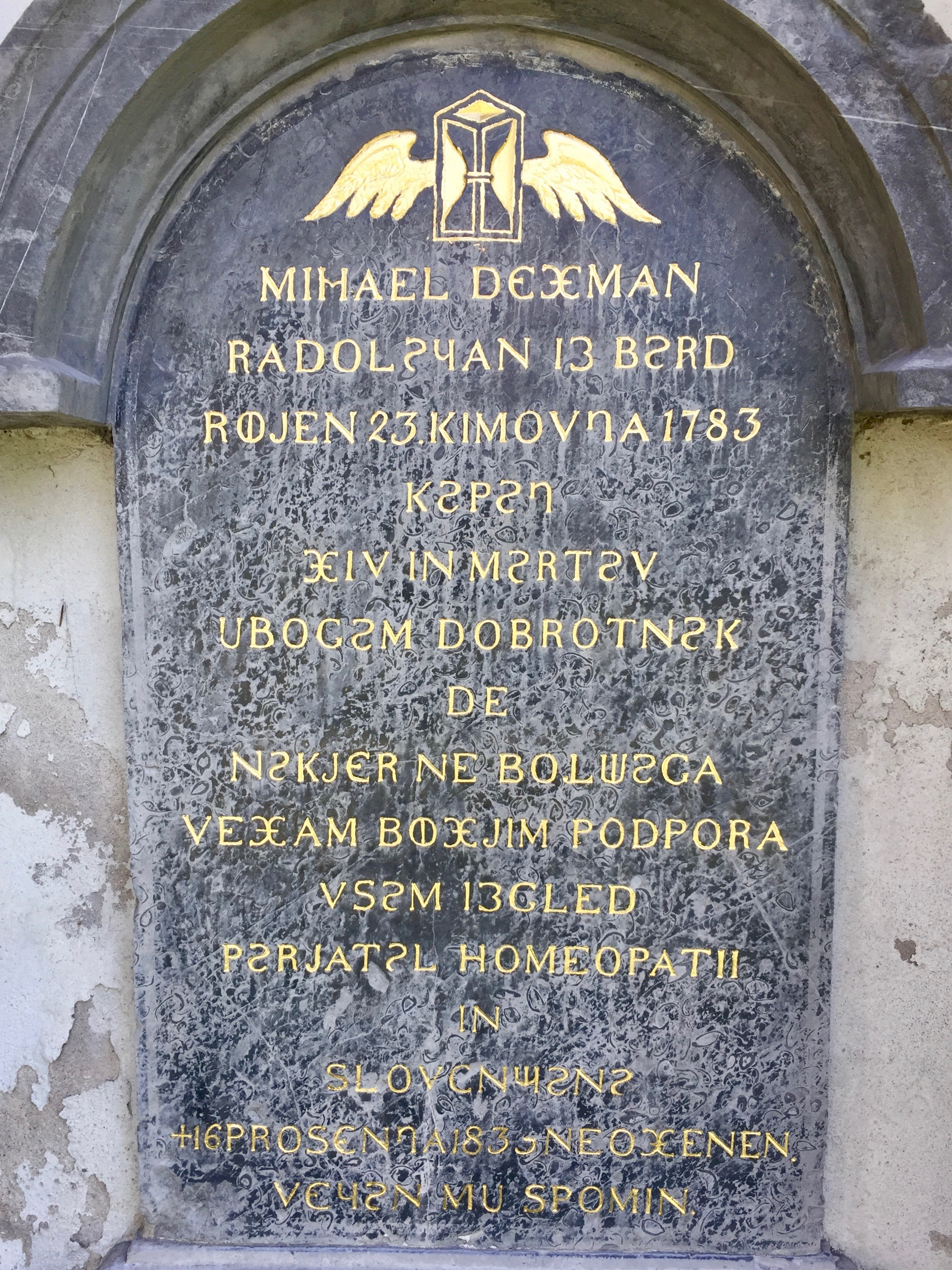
Tombstone of Mihael Dežman at Navje Memorial Park in Ljubljana, written in the Metelko alphabet

== History ==
Metelko introduced his alphabet in the book Lehrgebäude der slowenischen Sprache im Königreiche Illyrien und in den benachbarten Provinzen (Textbook of the Slovene Language of the Kingdom of Illyria and Neighboring Provinces, 1825). He invented his alphabet to replace the Bohorič alphabet (Slovene: bohoričica), which was considered problematic in certain situations. Metelko was influenced by the ideas of Jernej Kopitar, a well-known linguist who also participated in the development of the modern Serbian alphabet (created by Vuk Karadžić, following Kopitar's ideas).

== Alphabet ==
Metelko's alphabet has 32 letters in the following order:

Special letters are explained in the following table (other letters have the same meaning as in modern Slovene):

Metelko alphabet
Upper case	Lower case	IPA	Modern Slovene
Ƞ	ƞ	/ts/	c
Ɥ	ɥ	/tʃ/	č
S	s	/s/	s
		/ʃ/	š
Ꚇ		/ʃtʃ/	šč
З	з	/z/	z
𝔛	𝔵	/ʒ/	ž
H	h	/h/	h
		/x/	h
	ɺ	/lj/	lj
	ꬻ	/nj/	nj
E	e	/ɛ/	e (ê)
Є	є	/e/	e (é)
Ƨ	ƨ	/ə/	e (ə)
O	o	/o/	o (ó)
Ꟁ	ꟁ	/ɔ/	o (ô)

Metelko wanted to solve the problem of the formerly used digraphs ZH (for /tʃ/), SH (for /ʃ/ and /ʒ/), LJ and NJ by replacing them with the special letters,, and, based on the Cyrillic letters Ч, Ш, Ж.

The difference between glottal and velar (/h/, /x/) is in fact not relevant to Slovene phonology, and therefore the letter was omitted by some authors.

In the Bohorič alphabet, certain words with different pronunciations had the same spelling. Metelko wanted to solve this problem by splitting E into three variants and O into two variants. Metelko's letters, and represent the vowels /ɛ/, /e/, and /ə/, which were formerly written with E. Metelko's letters and represent the vowels /o/ and /ɔ/, which were formerly written with O.

== Impact ==
The main problem of Metelko's alphabet was its graphic design. Metelko's letters appeared strange to the average Slovene writer and the alphabet itself was soon nicknamed krevljica 'the twisted/crooked alphabet'. Some letters were in fact difficult to write by hand. In addition to Metelko being strongly influenced by his own dialect, certain solutions were not accepted by speakers of other dialects. Soon strong opposition arose against Metelko's alphabet.

After the "Slovene alphabet war" Metelko's alphabet was forbidden in 1833. A few years later Slovenes accepted Gaj's Latin alphabet (Slovene: gajica), which is easier to write. In this alphabet, the various mid vowels are written using diacritics (é, ê, è, ó, ô, ò), but only in cases when it is necessary to distinguish two words (e.g. klóp 'bench' vs. klôp 'tick').

The IETF language tags have assigned the variant sl-metelko to Slovene in the Metelko alphabet.

== See also ==
- Slovene alphabet

== Sources ==
- Toporišič, Jože. 1993. "Metelčica." Enciklopedija Slovenije, vol. 7, pp. 103–104. Ljubljana: Mladinska knjiga.
