= Ljubljanske novice =

Online newspaper in Slovenia

Ljubljanske novice - slovenski elektronski časopis ("Ljubljana's News - Slovenian electronic newspaper") is a stand-alone online newspaper, based in Ljubljana, Slovenia.

Newspaper was registered on 20 October 1995 by Urad Republike Slovenije za informiranje (Bureau of Republic of Slovenia for Information); it became the first Slovenian online newspaper and one of the first stand-alone online newspapers in Europe. Founder and its chief editor is Janez Temlin.

== Literature ==
- Neuland Europa: sechswege nach brüssel; 2002: ISBN 3-89790-016-5
- Ljubljana - mesto kulture; COBISS 66898432

== See also ==
- Valentin Vodnik's Lublanske novice, first Slovenian newspaper

s
