= Vodnik Square =

Town square in Ljubljana, Slovenia

Coordinates: 46°3′4″N 14°30′34″E

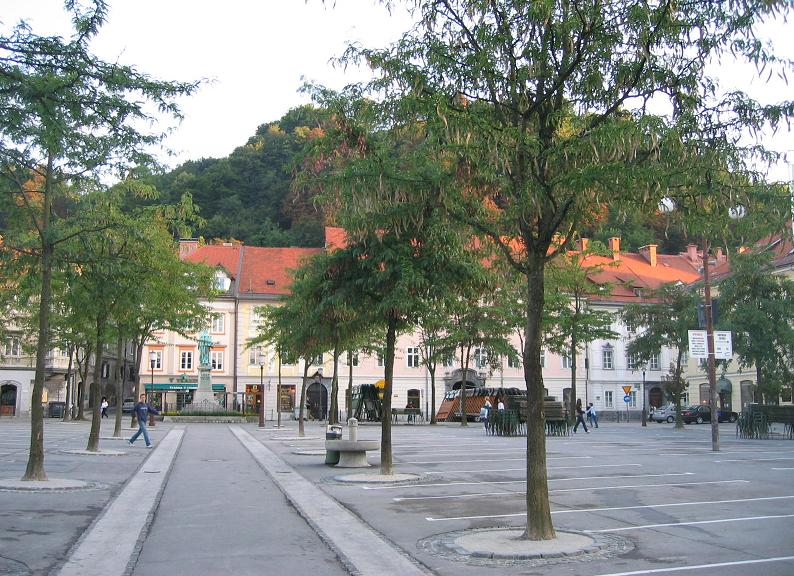
Vodnik Square

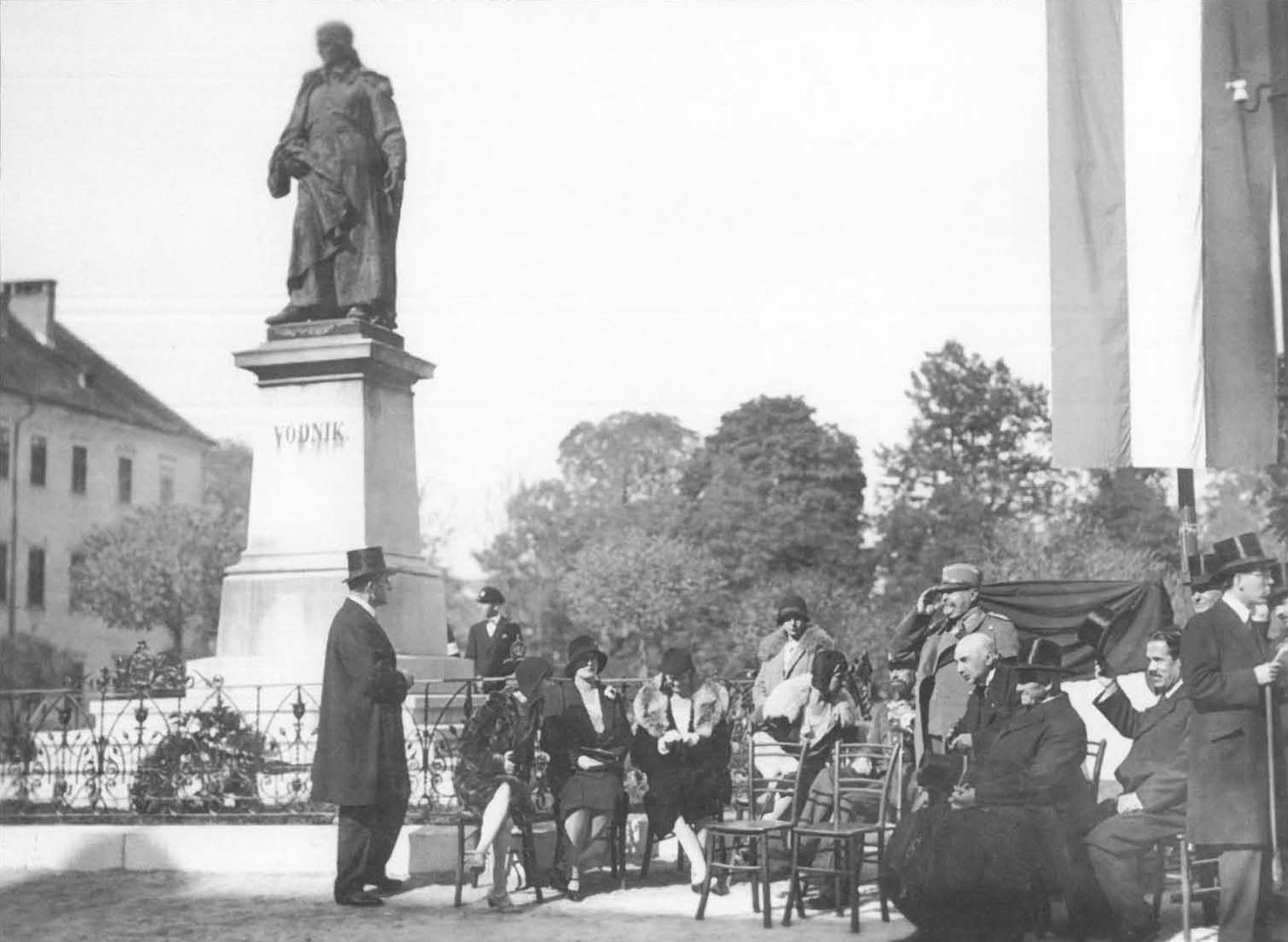
The statue of Valentin Vodnik and a celebration next at the square on the 120th anniversary of the Illyrian Provinces in 1929.

Vodnik Square (Slovene: Vodnikov trg) is a town square in Ljubljana, the capital of Slovenia. It spans the area from the Dragon Bridge across Pogačar Square (Pogačarjev trg) to the Triple Bridge.

It is named after Valentin Vodnik, a Slovene priest, journalist, and poet from the late Enlightenment period. There is a monument with a statue in the square commemorating him. It was sculpted by Alojzij Gangl and unveiled in 1889. Across the street from the monument is a path leading to Castle Hill.

In 1895, when an earthquake destroyed much of an old monastery containing a girls’ diocesan college and library, it had to be completely pulled down and the square became an outdoor market now called the Ljubljana Central Market.
