= Vodnik Monument =

Monument in Ljubljana, Slovenia

Coordinates: 46°3′2.9″N 14°30′34.33″E

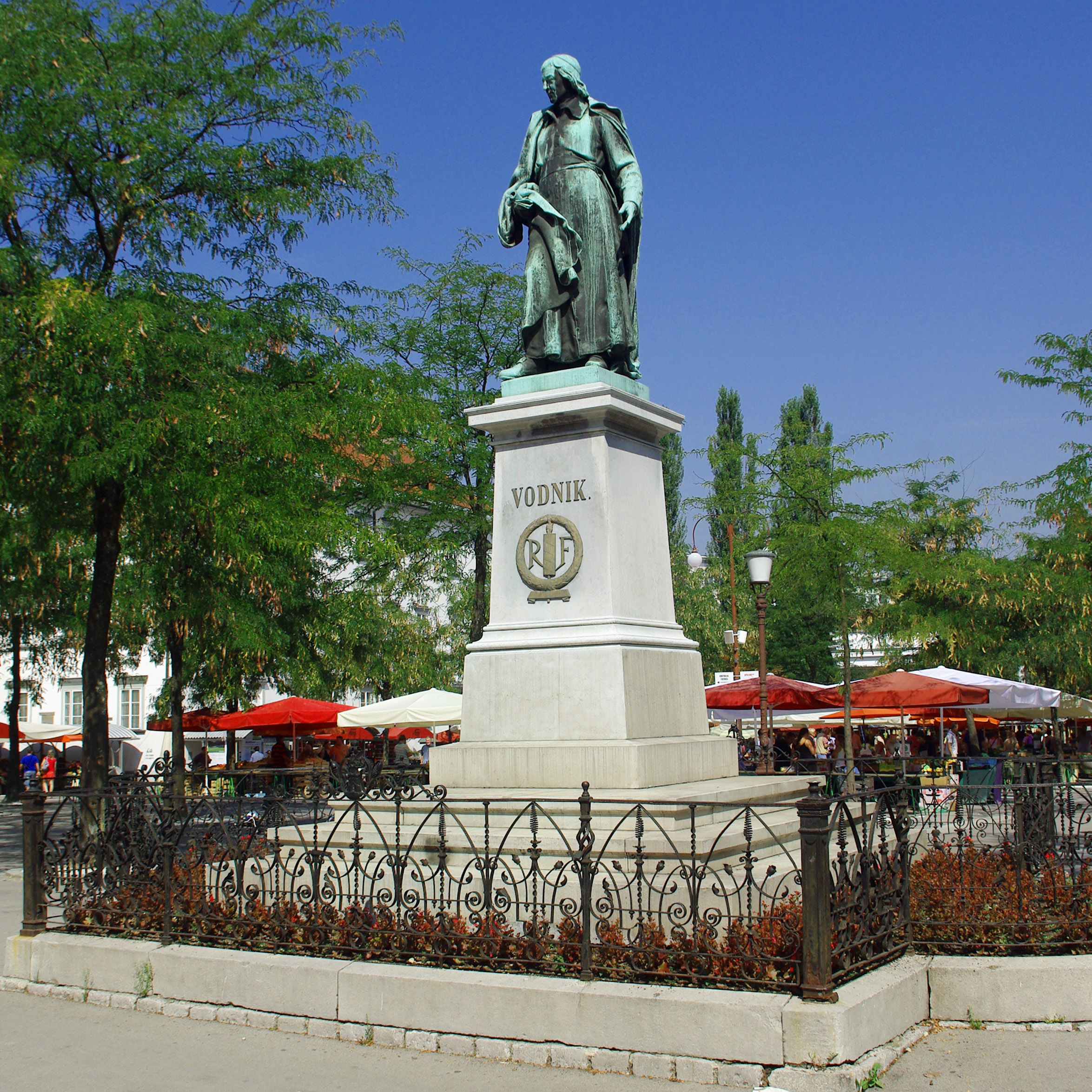
Front side

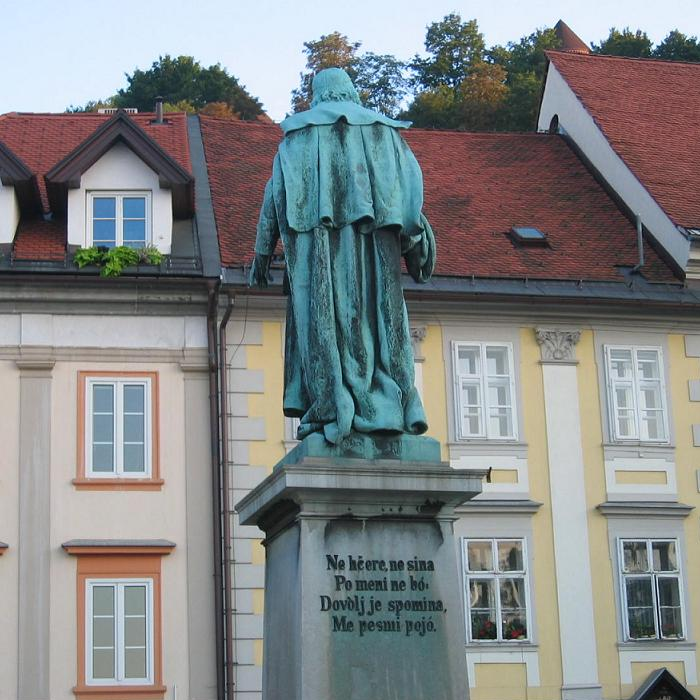
Back side

The Vodnik Monument at Vodnik Square in Ljubljana

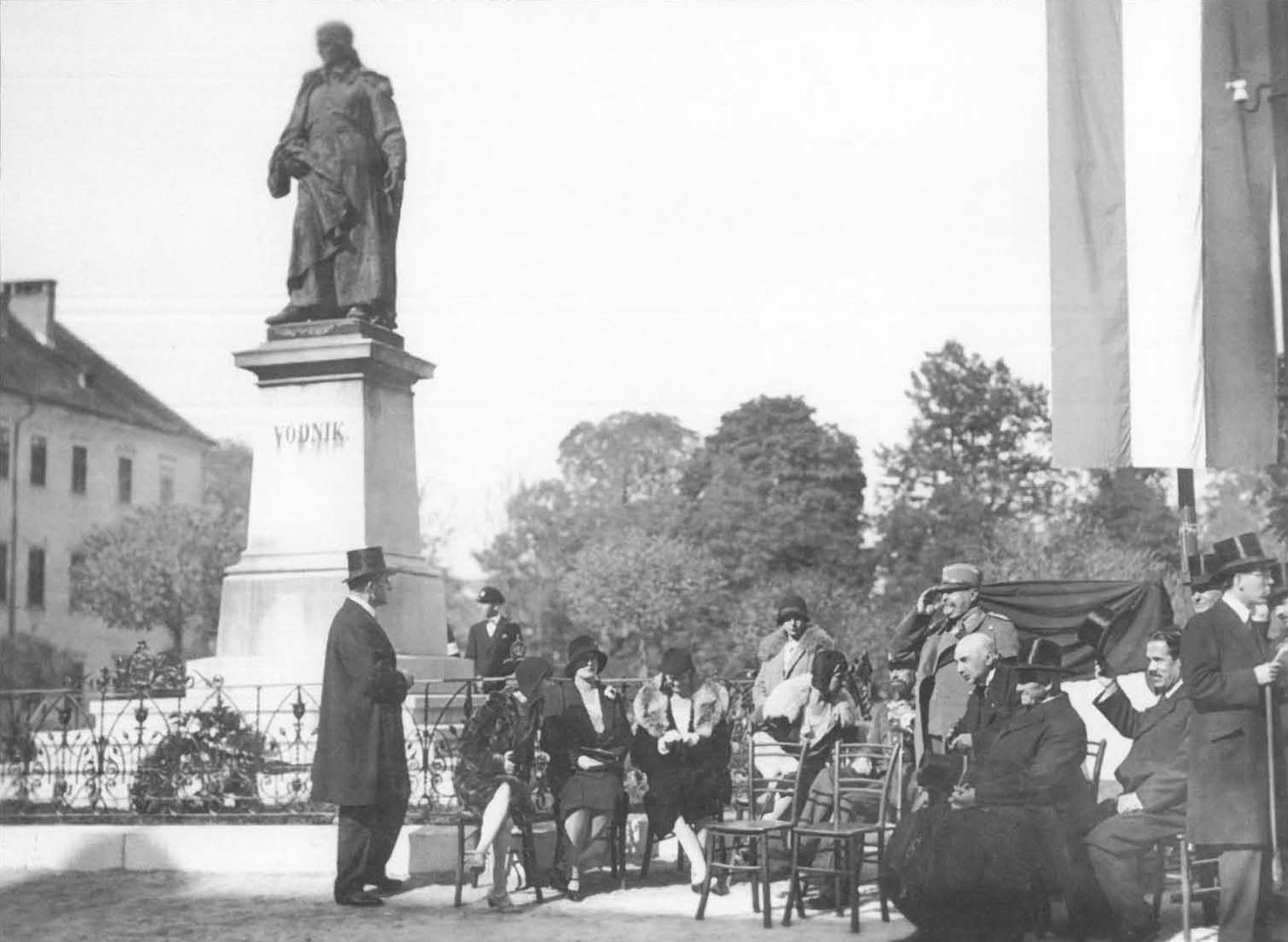
Commemoration of the 110th anniversary of Vodnik's death in 1929. For the occasion, Vodnik Square in Ljubljana was adorned with Yugoslav and French flags.

The Vodnik Monument (Slovene: Vodnikov spomenik) or the Monument to Valentin Vodnik (Spomenik Valentinu Vodniku) stands at Vodnik Square (Vodnikov trg) in Ljubljana, the capital of Slovenia, in the immediate vicinity of the Ljubljana Central Market. It is dedicated to the Carniolan priest, poet and journalist Valentin Vodnik (1758−1819), a major figure in the Slovene National Awakening.

The monument was proposed by the politician Lovro Toman on the occasion of the 100th anniversary of the poet's birth; the effort to erect it was organised by the Writers' Support Society in collaboration with the Slovene Society. The bronze statue was cast in bronze by the young sculptor Alojz Gangl (1859−1935) between 1887 to 1889 in Vienna, and was unveiled atop a simple stone pedestal on 30 June 1889 with a three-day celebration as the first public Slovene national monument. The pedestal has the bronze inscription reading VODNIK. on its obverse; the reverse is inscribed with the final verse of Vodnik's 1806 poem Moj spomenik ("My Monument"):

Ne hčere ne sina
Po meni ne bo.
Dovolj je spomina,
Me pesmi pojó.

...meaning:

Neither daughter nor son
shall come after me
but memory suffices;
my songs sing of me.

Vodnik had been an ardent supporter of the Napoleonic Illyrian Provinces, which he saw as fostering Slovene ethnic and linguistic consciousness; one of his longest poems was a classicizing ode to Napoleon. To commemorate the 120th anniversary of the establishment of the Provinces, France donated a bronze decoration for the pedestal in 1929; this comprises the letters RF (for République Française) flanking a fasces surmounted with a hand with two fingers extended in a blessing (a reference to Vodnik's clerical vocation), all enclosed in a laurel wreath, over a scroll with the inscription "A Vodnik".
