= Magdalena Pleiweis =

Slovenia writer

- Born: Magdalena Knafel; July 21, 1815; Maria Elend, Carinthia, Austria
- Died: July 20, 1890 (aged 75); Ljubljana
- Occupation: Writer
- Notable work: Slovenska Kuharica (Slovene Cookbook)

Pleiweis's cookbook

Magdalena Pleiweis (21 July 1815 – 20 July 1890) was the author of the first Slovene cookbook.

Magalena Knafel was born 21 July 1815 in Maria Elend, Carinthia, into a farming family. Her parents were Joseph Knafel and Maria (née Wernig) Knafel. She married Valentin Pleyweiß (Pleiweis) on 20 January 1856 in the cathedral in Ljubljana. She was his third wife and thus the stepmother of Valentin Pleiweis Jr. and Janez Bleiweis.

She was considered a good cook and, inspired by Valentin Vodnik's Kuharske bukve (Cookbook, 1799), she wrote the first real Slovene cookbook, titled Slovenska kuharica ali navod okusno kuhati navadna in imenitna jedila (Slovene Cookbook or Instructions for Cooking Tasty Common and Elaborate Dishes, 1868). This included several of Vodnik's more popular recipes but with the addition of traditional Slovenian dishes and without Vodnik's sections about preserving the Slovene language. This book continued to be reissued, with new editions into the 21st century. A later editor, Felicita Kalinšek, developed the cookbook further with revisions in 1912 and 1935 so that it contained 3,000 recipes. The book had reached its 13th edition by 1956. The cookbook was repopularised in the 1970s and updated in the 1990s.

Pleiweis died of a stroke in Ljubljana on 20 July 1890 and was buried at Saint Christopher's Cemetery in Ljubljana.

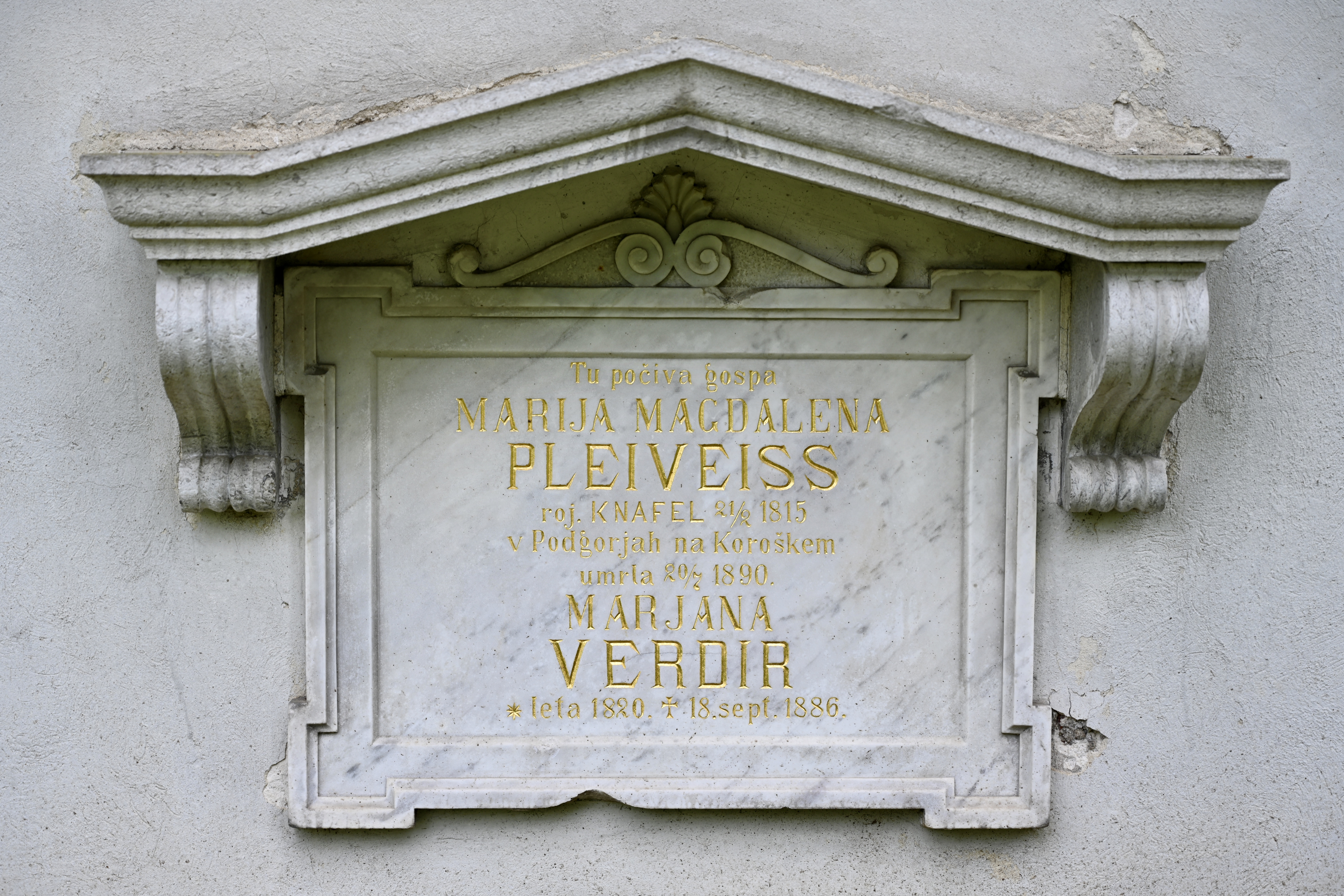
Pleiweis's memorial stone in Ljubljana
