= Felicita Kalinšek =

Slovene nun and cookbook author (1865–1937)

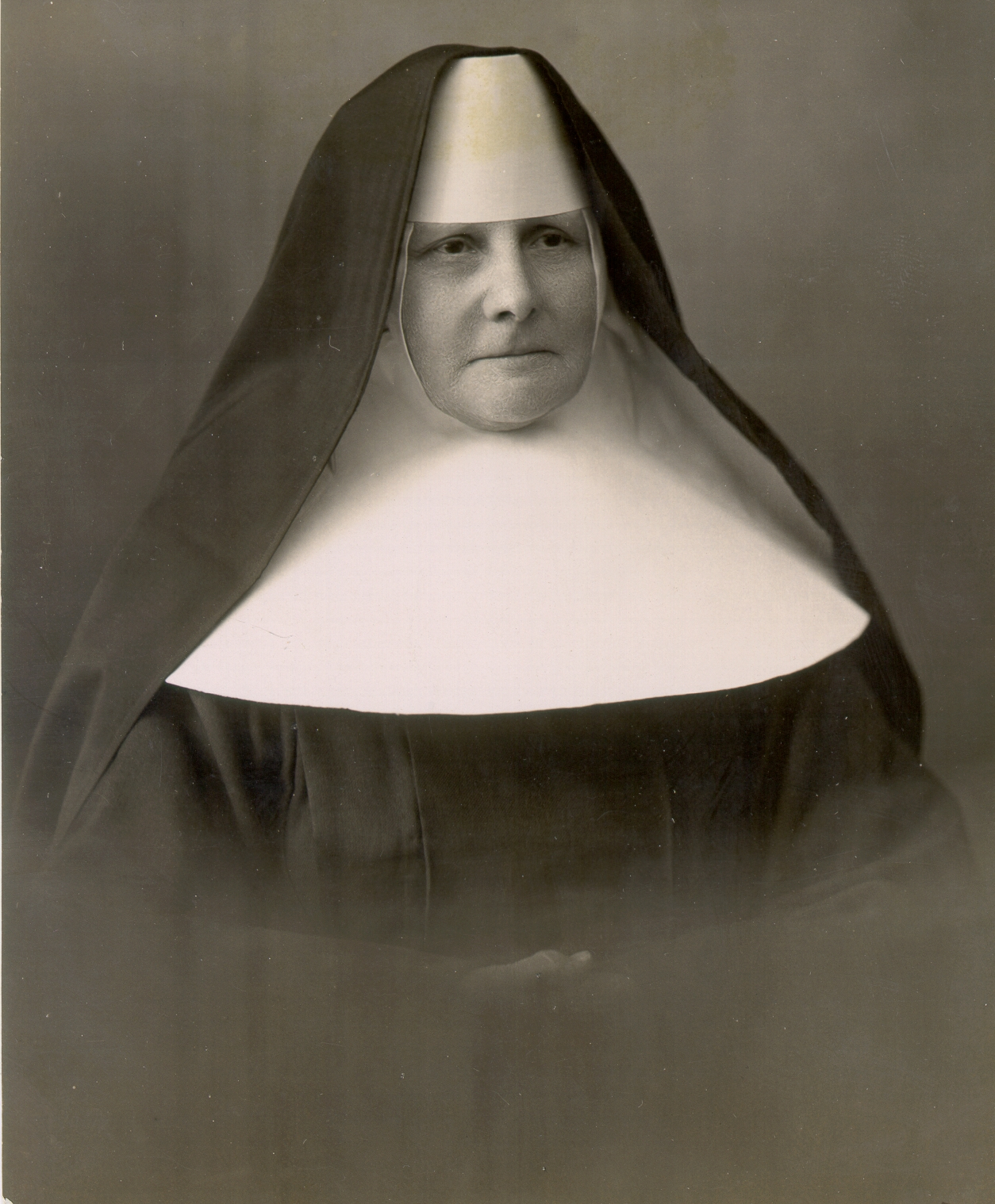
Sister Felicita Kalinšek

Felicita Kalinšek (September 5, 1865 – September 21, 1937) was a Slovenian nun who became the first cooking teacher at the School of Home Economics in Ljubljana. She is noted for her cookbook which was first published in 1923. It was a revision of Magdalena Pleiweis's Slovenska kuharica ali navod okusno kuhati navadna in imenitna jedila (The Slovene Cookbook, or Instructions for Cooking Tasty Common and Elaborate Dishes, 1868).

Terezija Kalinšek was born in Podgorje, a village near Kamnik, to Tomaž Kalinšek and Uršula Kalinšek. She became a novice at a convent in Maribor in 1892 and took the religious name Felicita. She made a life-long vow to be a Catholic nun in 1896. She trained as both a teacher and chef. She was sent to work in Ljubljana when the church opened an agricultural catering school there in 1898. Her role was now to teach cookery and to supervise catering for important church officials such as the bishop. She also began to revise and expand The Slovene Cookbook, including updates on food storage and preservation as well as many more recipes. By the 8th edition (1935) it was published under her name alone.

Terezija Kalinšek died on September 21, 1937 at Our Lady’s Orphanage and School (Slovene: Marijanišče) in Ljubljana, where she had worked for 43 years. She is buried in Žale Central Cemetery in Ljubljana.
