= Podgorje, Kamnik =

Podgorje
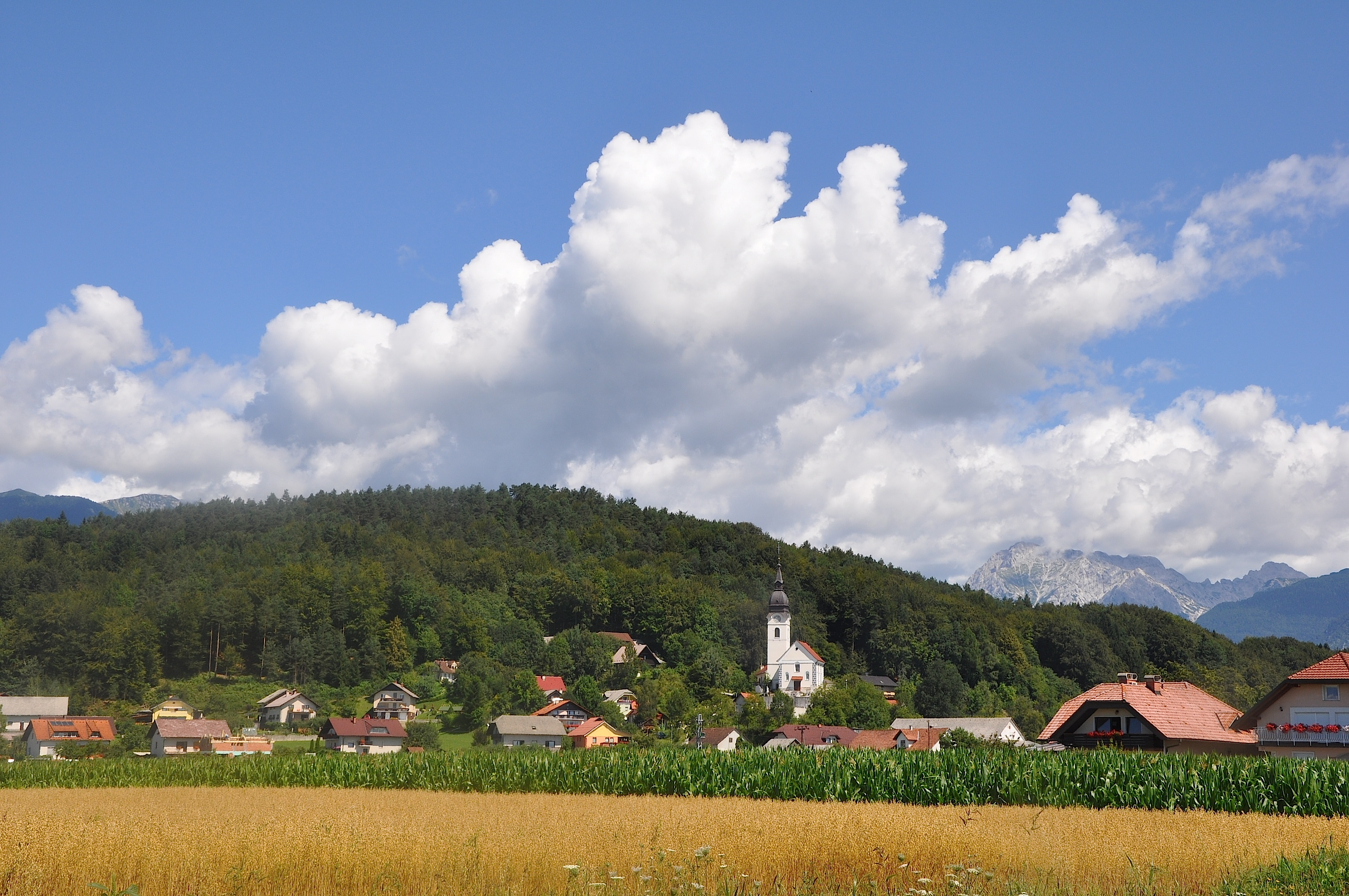

- Location in Slovenia
- Coordinates: 46°13′2.55″N 14°35′28.76″E
- Country: Slovenia
- Traditional region: Upper Carniola
- Statistical region: Central Slovenia
- Municipality: Kamnik

Area
  - Total: 6.4 km^{2} (2.5 sq mi)
- Elevation: 376.7 m (1,236 ft)

Population (2015)
  - Total: 1,009
  - Density: 157/km^{2} (410/sq mi)

Podgorje (pronounced [pɔdˈɡoːɾjɛ]; German: Podgier) is a settlement that is a now a suburb of the town of Kamnik in the Upper Carniola region of Slovenia.

== Mass graves ==
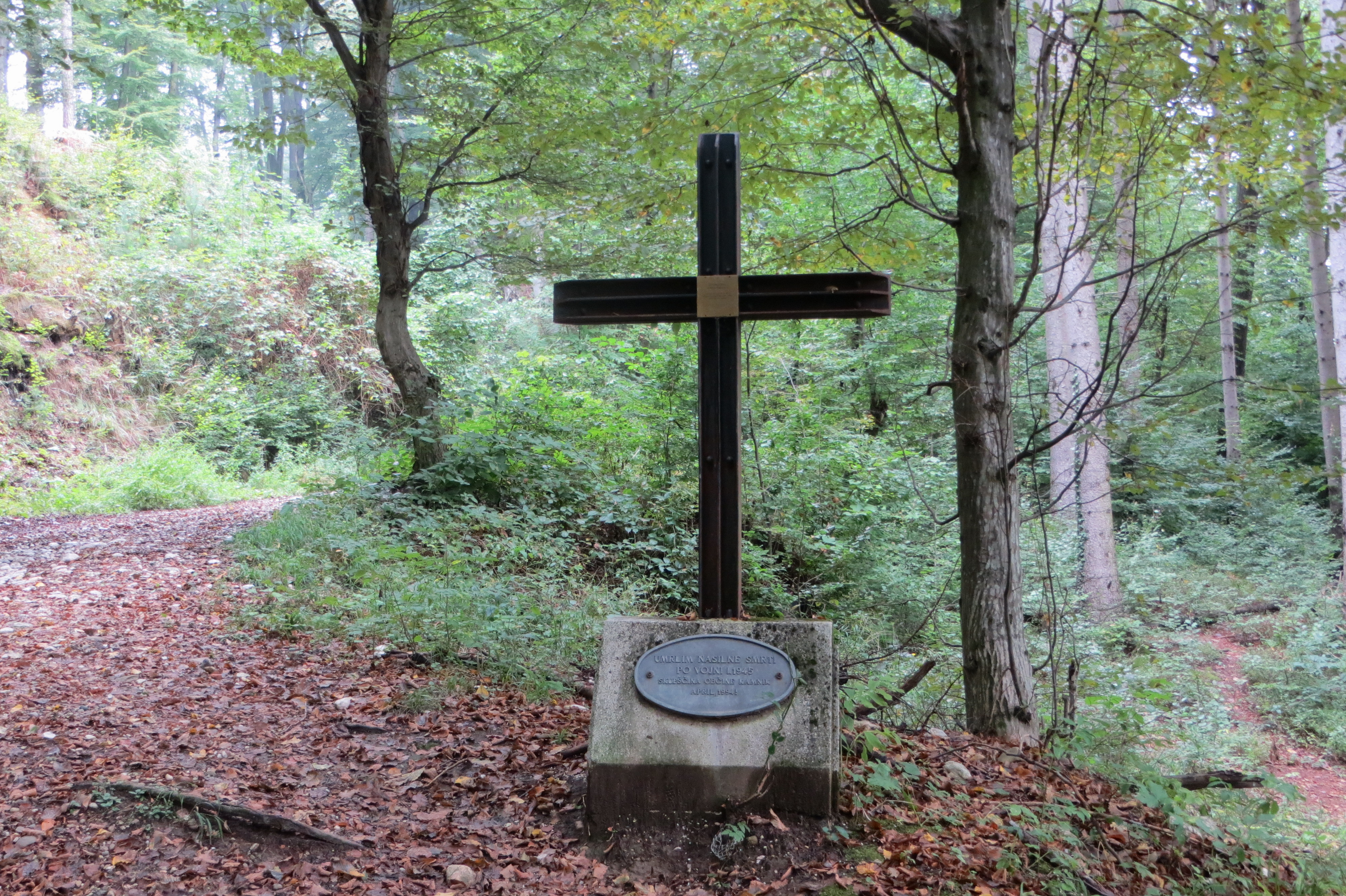
The Podgorje 1 Mass Grave

Podgorje is the site of four known mass graves from the period immediately after the Second World War. The Podgorje 1–4 mass graves (Slovene: Grobišče Podgorje 1–4) are located on Golaš Hill in the hamlet of Zaprice, in the northwest part of the settlement. The first grave is on the east side of the hill, on a path in the woods at the top of a small rise north of the Medved farm (Podgorje no. 5). It contains the remains of six people shot in May or June 1945 while fleeing from the prison camp near the railroad tracks. It is also known as the Medved Farm Mass Grave (Slovene: Grobišče pri Medvedovi domačiji). The grave is marked by a metal cross and a bronze memorial plaque mounted on a concrete base, arranged by the Municipality of Kamnik in 1996.

Graves two through four lie in the Svetel Woods (Slovene: Svetelov gozd) along a path on the south slope of Golaš Hill, facing Dobrava Hill. Grave two is east of a water catchment installation, grave three on the slope of a sinkhole, and grave four at the top of a small rise. They contain the remains of murdered Ustaša officers from the prisoner of war camp in Kamnik. The graves are also known as the Svetel Woods Postwar Victims Grave (Slovene: Grobišče povojnih žrtev v Svetelovem gozdu). They are marked by a metal cross and a bronze memorial plaque mounted on a concrete base, arranged by the Municipality of Kamnik in 1994.

== Church ==
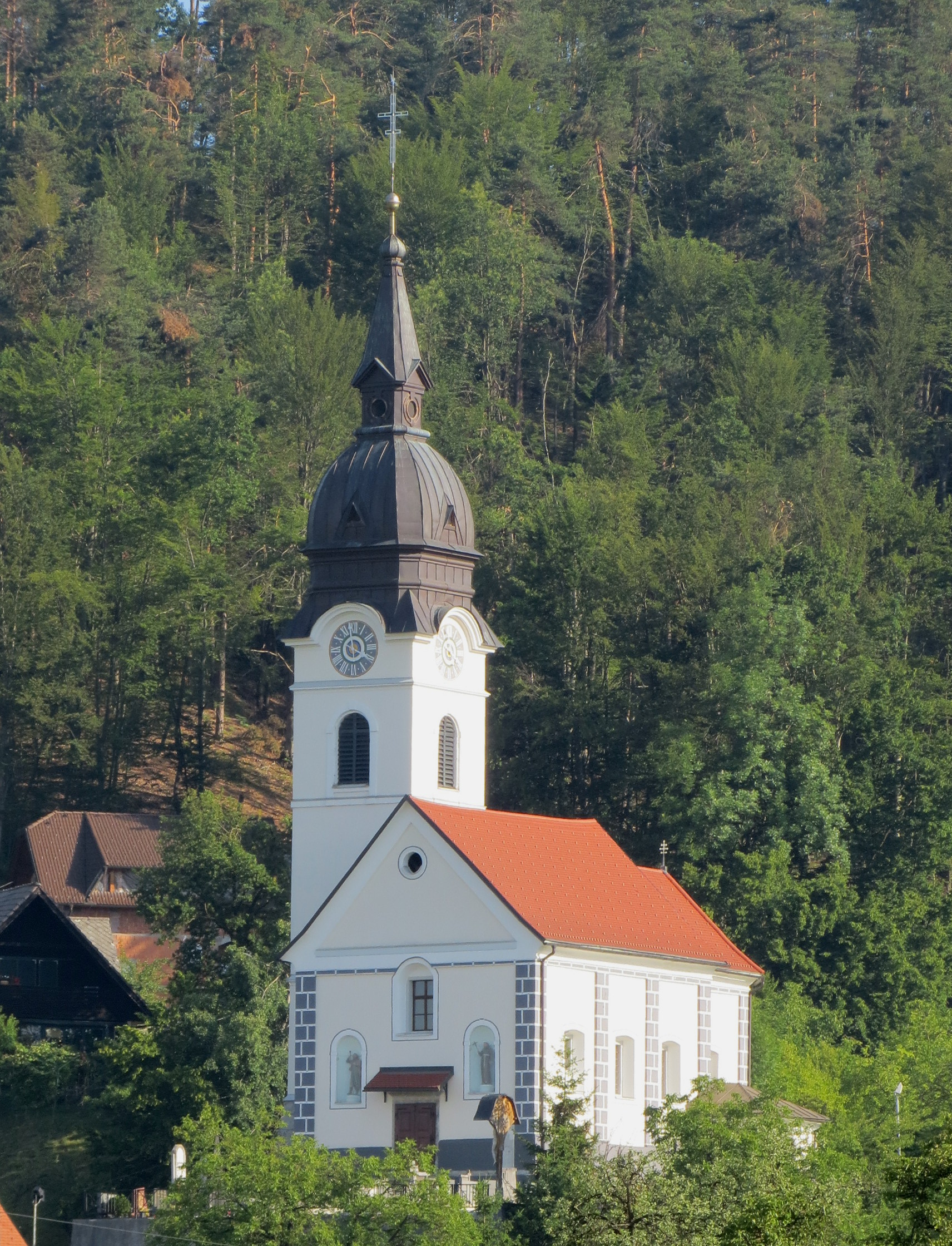
Saint Nicholas' Church

The local church is dedicated to Saint Nicholas. It is a Baroque church from the 18th century that was built at the site of a former Gothic church from the 16th century. It is a chapel of ease belonging to the Parish of Kamnik. It is a single-nave barrel-vaulted structure with a narrow chancel. The bell tower was built in 1897 after the former tower was destroyed in the 1895 earthquake. The furnishings date from the 19th century and the altar painting is by Maks Koželj. The church stands next to a cemetery on a rise in the northeast part of Podgorje below Golaš Hill.

== Cultural heritage ==
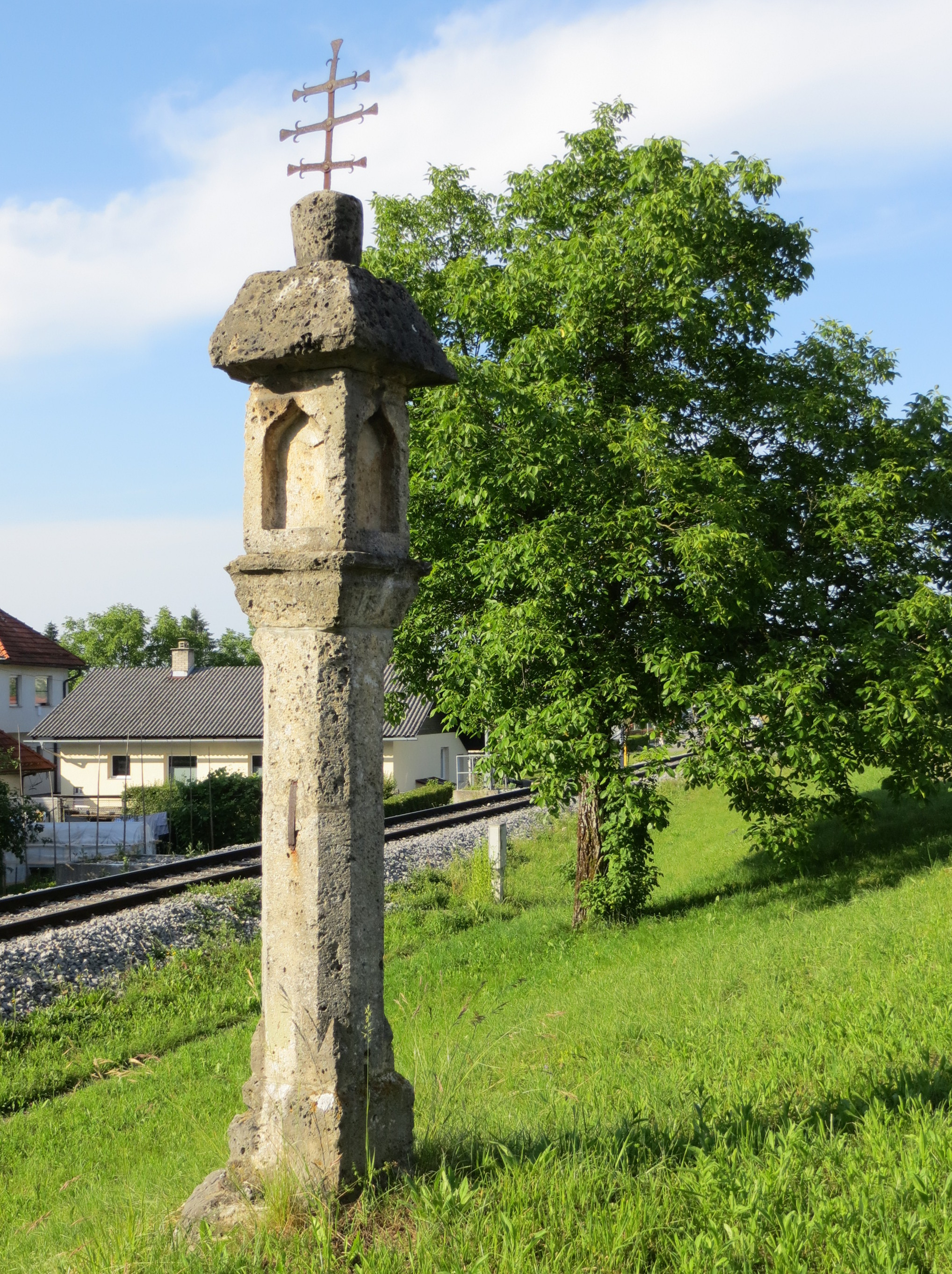
Wayside shrine from 1510

In addition to Saint Nicholas' Church, several other structures in Podgorje are registered as cultural heritage.

- There is a stone column shrine dating from 1510 on the eastern edge of Podgorje, between the main road and the railroad tracks. It is known as the "blood shrine" (Slovene: krvavo znamenje). This may refer to its location at a site where executions imposed by the court in Kamnik were carried out, or it may refer to painting on the shrine, traces of which are still visible.
- The cemetery next to Saint Nicholas' Church dates from the 19th century. It is arranged in several terraces and was expanded to the south and west in the 20th century. It contains individual gravestones of historical value and a monument to soldiers that died in the First World War in the shape of a slender triangular pyramid.
- Near the railroad there is a prehistoric burial site. Finds from the Bronze Age have been discovered there.
- The house where Josip Ogrinec was born is preserved as a memorial. It stands north of Saint Nicholas' Church at Podgorje no. 5. It is a traditional two-story stone house with a gabled roof covered by flat concrete roof tiles. The stone door casing bears the year 1861. A plaque was installed on the southwest wall of the house in 1961.

== Notable people ==
Notable people that were born or lived in Podgorje include:

- Felicita Kalinšek (born Terezija Kalinšek, 1865–1937), cookbook author
- Josip Ogrinec (1844–1879), writer, playwright, and translator
- Luka Svetec (1826–1921), poet, writer, politician, and journalist
- Blaž Svetelj (1893–1944), geographer
