= Valentin Vodnik =

Slovenian writer

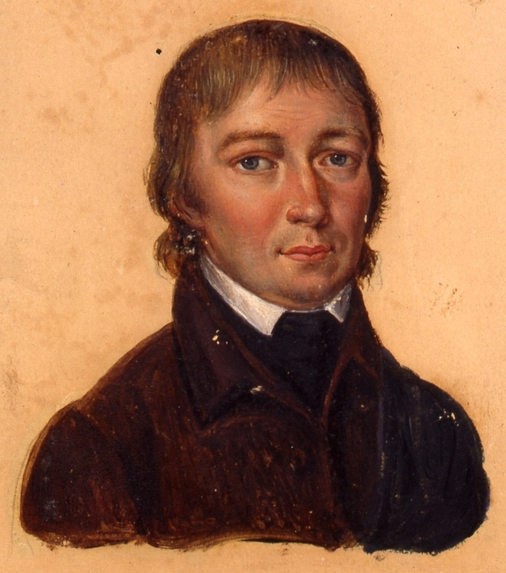
- Born: February 3, 1758; Zgornja Šiška, Habsburg monarchy
- Died: 8 January 1819 (aged 60); Ljubljana, Austrian Empire
- Occupations: Friar, priest, teacher, journalist, editor
- Writing career
- Years active: 1779–1818
- Literary movement: Age of Enlightenment

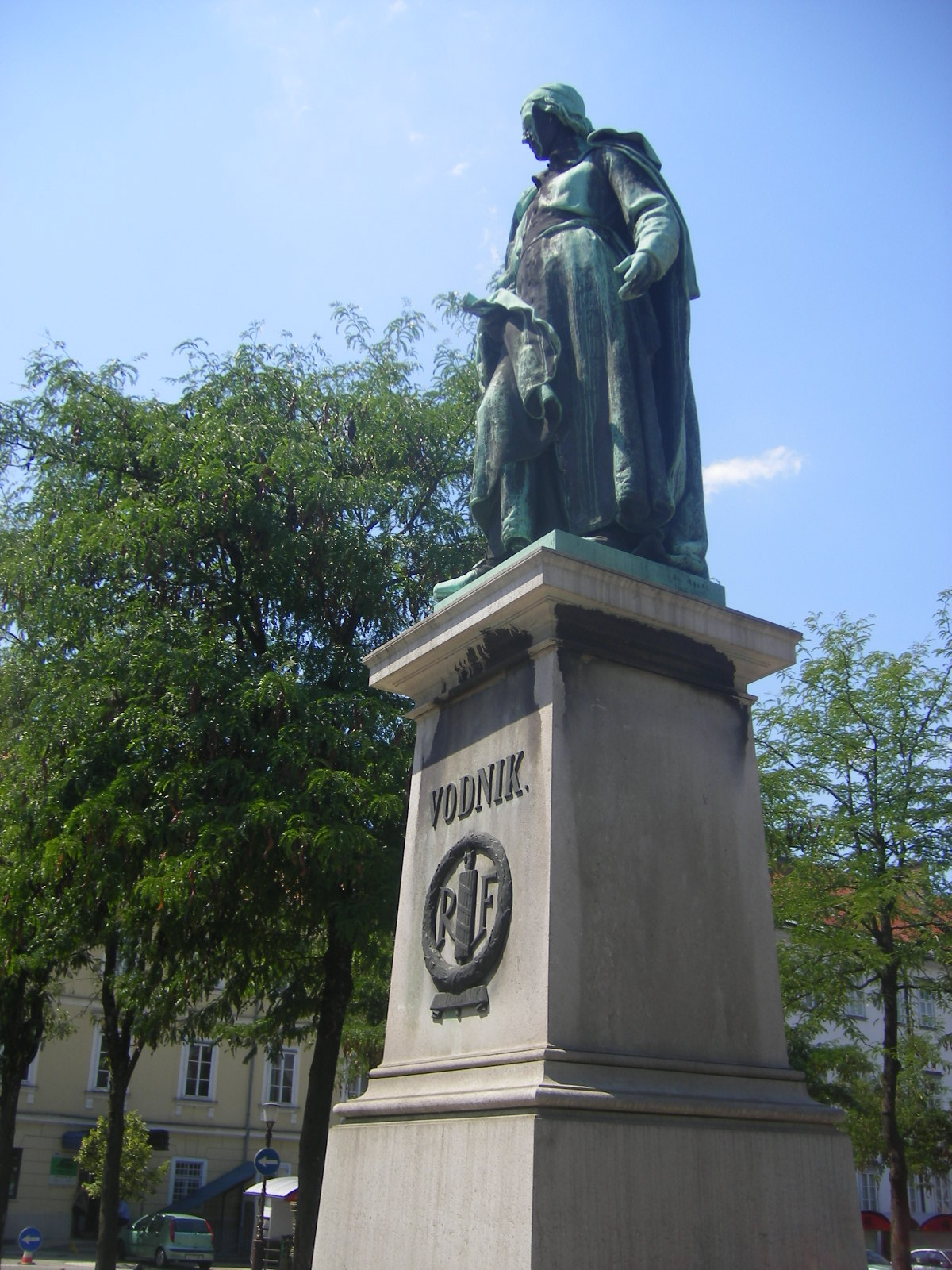
Vodnik Monument at Vodnik Square in Ljubljana

Valentin Vodnik (3 February 1758 – 8 January 1819) was a Slovene priest, journalist and poet from Carniola. He was active in the late Enlightenment period. He is well known for his contributions in writing materials that lifted the prestige of the Slovene language creating a standard meant to unify the people of Slovene Lands in a single intelligible tongue. He was also active in geological sciences, where he collaborated with Sigmund Zois in the research of the origin of the Julian Alps. He spent significant time curating his mineral collection consisting of 338 specimens.

== Life and work ==
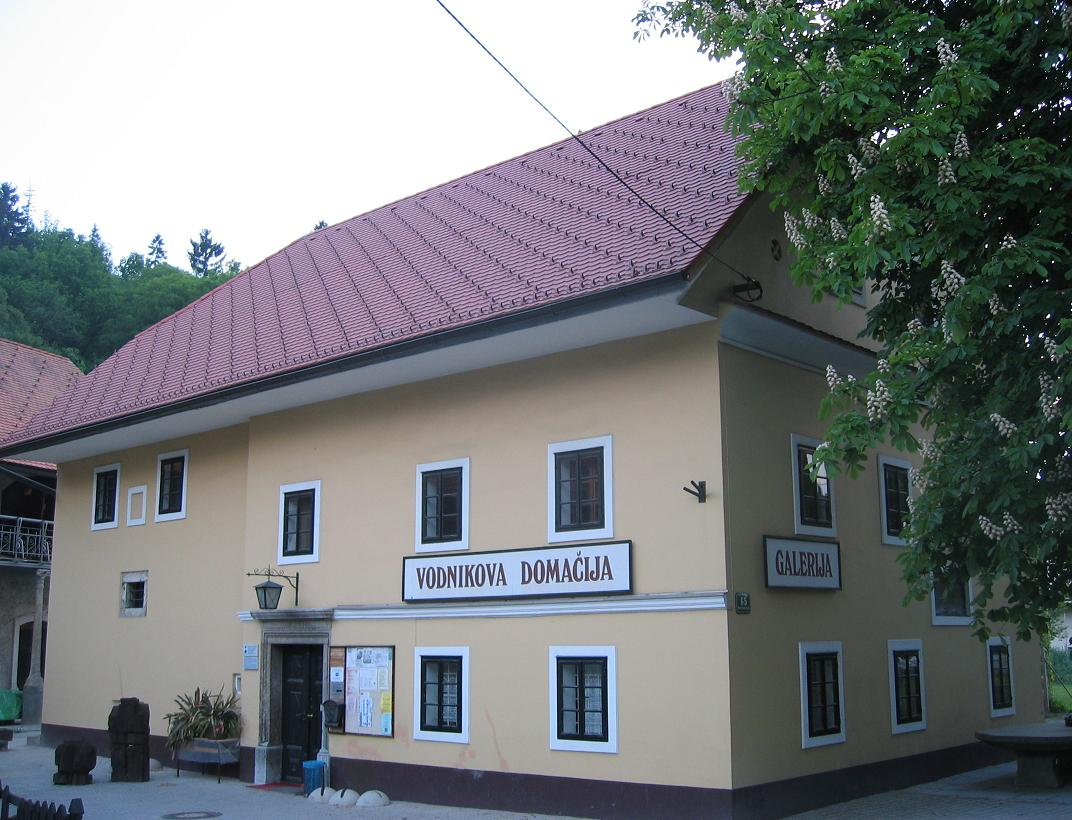
Vodnik's birthplace in Šiška, Ljubljana

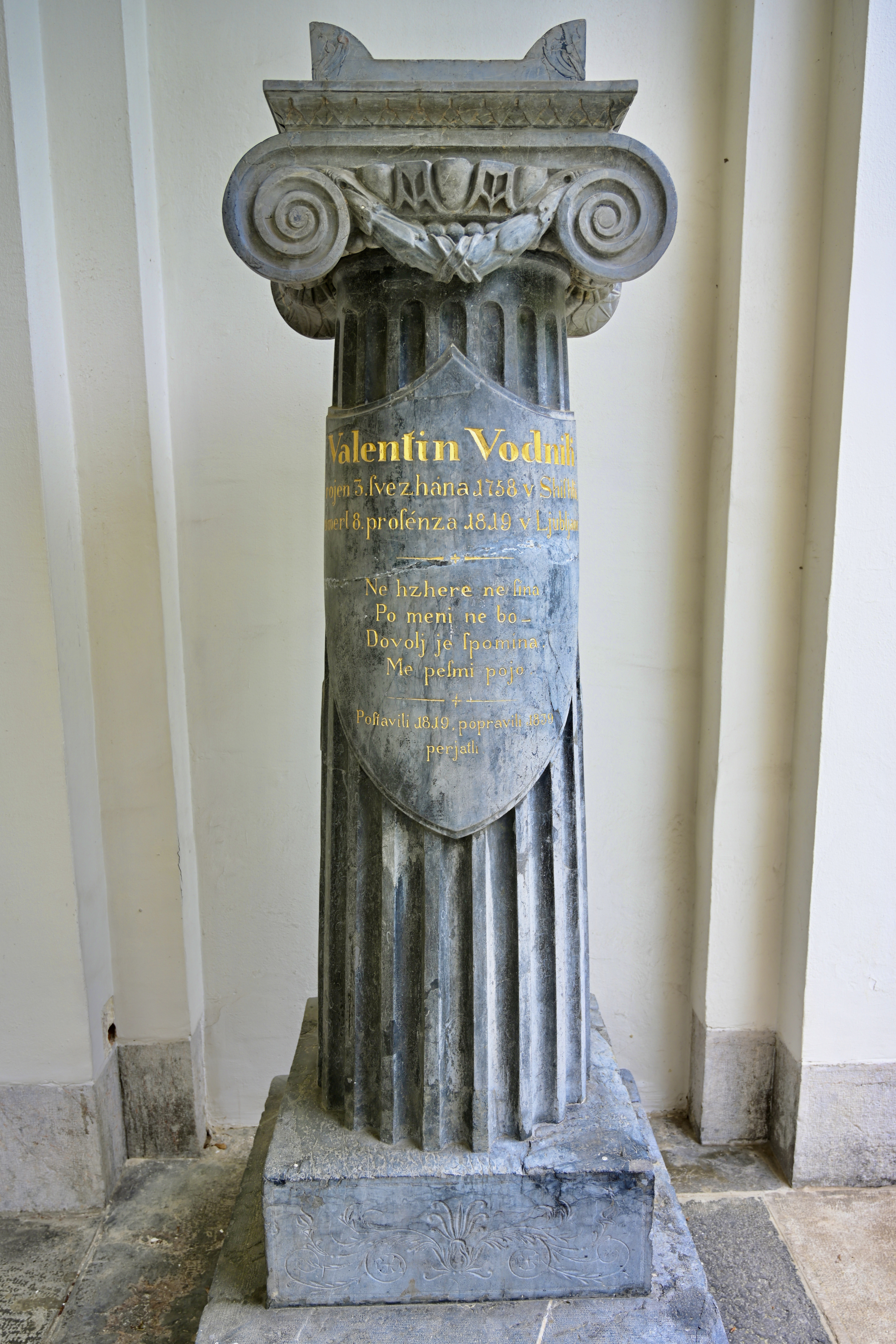
Tombstone of Valentin Vodnik at Navje, Ljubljana

Vodnik was born in Zgornja Šiška, now a suburb of Ljubljana, Slovenia, then part of the Habsburg monarchy. He was raised in a relatively well-to-do peasant-artisan family. He became a Franciscan and studied in Ljubljana, Novo Mesto and Gorizia, finishing his studies in 1782.

He worked as a priest in Ljubljana, in the Upper Carniolan village of Sora, in Bled, and in Ribnica. In 1793 he returned to Ljubljana and joined the intellectual circle of Sigmund Zois, in which several figures of the Slovenian Enlightenment gathered. Zois remained Vodnik's sponsor until his death. In 1797, Vodnik became a professor at the lyceum in Ljubljana.

Vodnik dedicated himself to writing poetry in Slovene, which he referred to as Carniolan. His first poems were published in Marko Pohlin's collections of Slovene folk songs. Vodnik's poetry was relatively simple, with a generally patriotic and satirical character. One of his most famous poems, "Dramilo" (A Pick-me-up), is a poetic appeal to Slovenes to be proud of their land, language, and heritage. In 1806, he published his first collection of poetry, entitled Pesme za pokušino (Poems for Sampling). He was also the editor of the first Slovenian newspaper Lublanske novice, which was issued twice a week from 1797 to 1800.

In addition to poetry and journalism, Vodnik also wrote grammars, textbooks, and even the first Slovene-language cookbook (Kuharske bukve, 1799) and a translation of a manual for midwives (Babištvo, "Midwifery"; 1818) by Johann Matoschek (Slovene: Jan Matoušek; 1790–1820).

In the 1810s, he became a fervent supporter of the French annexation of the Slovene Lands. In 1809, he wrote a poem, called Ilirija oživljena ("Illyria Reborn"), in which he praised Napoleon Bonaparte for having established the Illyrian Provinces. During the short-lived French administration, he was instrumental in convincing the authorities to promote the use of Slovene in education, culture, and administration. After the return of Austrian rule in 1813, most of these reforms in language policy were retained, but Vodnik himself was viewed with mistrust. He was retired and removed from public life. He died in Ljubljana at age 60. His gravestone is displayed in the Navje cemetery.

== Legacy ==
Vodnik is generally regarded as the first real poet in Slovene, as well as the first journalist. In his writings, written in the old bohoričica orthography, he used his native Upper Carniolan dialect, into which he incorporated words and grammatical features from other Slovenian dialects to make it more widely understood; his approach included purifying the common lexicon substituting German expressions with more local expressions obtained across many Slovene regions. Although he is rarely praised for being a deep or original poet, his poems convey honest sentiments, and his use of irony is noteworthy. As a member of Sigmund Zois' circle, he helped several younger talents, including France Prešeren, the most important Slovenian poet. After Vodnik's death, Prešeren wrote two elegies in his memory.

Valentin Vodnik was selected as the main motif for a recent commemorative coin series: the 250th anniversary of the birth of Valentin Vodnik, minted in January 2008. The obverse shows Valentin Vodnik's profile, the bottom portion of the coin is inscribed with the last verse of the poem "Moj spomenik," which in English says:

"No daughter no son, to come after me, enough memory done, my songs sing of me." The same verses are inscribed on the back side of the Vodnik Monument at Vodnik Square and also on his tombstone. The monument was erected in 1889. The bronze statue and the simple pedestal were made by Alojz Gangl. Some elements related to the faithfulness to the Illyrian Provinces were added to the pedestal in 1929.

Vodnik's cookbook was popular, with a mixture of mainly German recipes and sections about Slovene. It was developed into Slovenska kuharica (The Slovenian Cookbook, 1868) by Magdalena Pleiweis, which continued to be reissued into the 21st century.

== See also ==
- Anton Tomaž Linhart
- Jernej Kopitar
