= Slovenia =

Country in Central Europe

Republic of Slovenia Republika Slovenija
- Flag Coat of arms
- Anthem: Zdravljica (English: "A Toast")
- Location of Slovenia (dark green) – in Europe (green & dark grey) – in the European Union (green)
- Capital and largest city: Ljubljana; 46°03′05″N 14°30′22″E
- Official languages: Slovene
- Recognised regional languages: Hungarian; Italian
- Religion (2018): 77.9% Christianity; 73.4% Catholicism; 3.7% Orthodoxy; 0.7% other Christian; 18.3% no religion; 3.9% other
- Demonyms: Slovene; Slovenian
- Government: Unitary parliamentary republic
  - President: Nataša Pirc Musar
  - Prime Minister: Janez Janša
  - Speaker of the National Assembly: Zoran Stevanović
- Legislature: Parliament
  - Upper house: National Council
  - Lower house: National Assembly

Establishment
  - Carantania: Second half of the 7th century
  - State of Slovenes, Croats and Serbs: 29 October 1918
  - Kingdom of Serbs, Croats and Slovenes: 1 December 1918
  - Slovene National Liberation Committee: 19 February 1944
  - Socialist Federal Republic of Yugoslavia: 29 July 1944
  - Independence from Yugoslavia: 25 June 1991
  - Brioni Agreement signed: 7 July 1991
  - Current constitution: 24 December 1991

Area
  - Total: 20,272 km^{2} (7,827 sq mi) (150th)
  - Water (%): 0.7

Population
  - 2026 estimate: ▲2,138,751 (144th)
  - 2002 census: 1,964,036
  - Density: 105.5/km^{2} (273.2/sq mi) (114th)
- GDP (PPP): 2026 estimate
  - Total: ▲$132.894 billion (99th)
  - Per capita: ▲$62,255 (36th)
- GDP (nominal): 2026 estimate
  - Total: ▲$88.869 billion (86th)
  - Per capita: ▲$41,631 (36th)
- Gini (2023): ▼23.4 low inequality
- HDI (2023): ▲0.931 very high (21st)
- Currency: Euro (€) (EUR)
- Time zone: UTC+1 (CET)
  - Summer (DST): UTC+2 (CEST)
- Date format: dd. mm. yyyy (Slovene) dd/mm/yyyy (Italian) yyyy. mm. dd. (Hungarian)
- Calling code: +386
- ISO 3166 code: SI
- Internet TLD: .si

Slovenia, (Note: /sloʊˈviːniə, slə-/ sloh-VEE-nee-ə; Slovene: Slovenija [slɔˈʋèːnija]),) officially the Republic of Slovenia, (Note: Slovene: Republika Slovenija) is a country in Central Europe. It borders Italy to its west, Austria to its north, Hungary to its northeast, and Croatia to its south and southeast; its southwestern boundary consists of a 46.6-kilometre (29.0 mi) coastline on the Adriatic Sea. The country is mostly mountainous and forested, covering 20,271 square kilometres (7,827 sq mi). Its population is approximately 2.1 million people. Slovene is the official language. Slovenia has a predominantly temperate continental climate, with the exception of the Slovene Littoral and the Julian Alps. Ljubljana, the capital and largest city, is geographically situated near the centre of the country. Other urban centers include Maribor, Ptuj, Kranj, Celje, Koper, Novo Mesto, Velenje, Nova Gorica, Sežana, Murska Sobota, and Jesenice.

The region has a long history of settlement. Proto-Illyrian tribes settled the area during the Early Bronze Age, stretching from present-day Albania to the city of Trieste, while the Slavic tribes (the ancestors of modern Slovenes) arrived in the 5th century AD. The present territory has been part of many different states, including the Roman Empire, the Western Roman Empire, the Carolingian Empire, the Holy Roman Empire, the Kingdom of Hungary, the Republic of Venice, the Habsburg Empire, Napoleonic France, the Austrian Empire and the Austro-Hungarian Empire.

The Kingdom of Serbs, Croats, and Slovenes was formed in December 1918; in 1929, the Kingdom became known as Yugoslavia. In 1941, during World War II, Slovenia's territory was partitioned by Nazi Germany, Fascist Italy, Horthyist Hungary, and the Independent State of Croatia. Following World War II, in 1945 Slovenia was established as one of six constituent republics that made up the Socialist Federal Republic of Yugoslavia. Modern Slovenia emerged in June 1991, when the country declared independence from Yugoslavia. After the brief Ten-Day War, it became a sovereign state.

Slovenia is a developed country, with a high-income economy characterized by a mixture of traditional industries, such as manufacturing and agriculture, and modern sectors, such as information technology and financial services and has a developed tourism sector. The economy is highly dependent on trade, with exports accounting for a significant portion of Gross Domestic Product (GDP). Slovenia is a member of the Council of Europe, the European Union, the United Nations, NATO, the Organization for Security and Co-operation in Europe, and other associations in the global community.

== Etymology ==
The name Slovenia etymologically means "land of the Slavs". The origin of the name Slav itself remains uncertain. The suffix -en forms a demonym.

== History ==
=== Prehistory to Slavic settlement ===
==== Prehistory ====
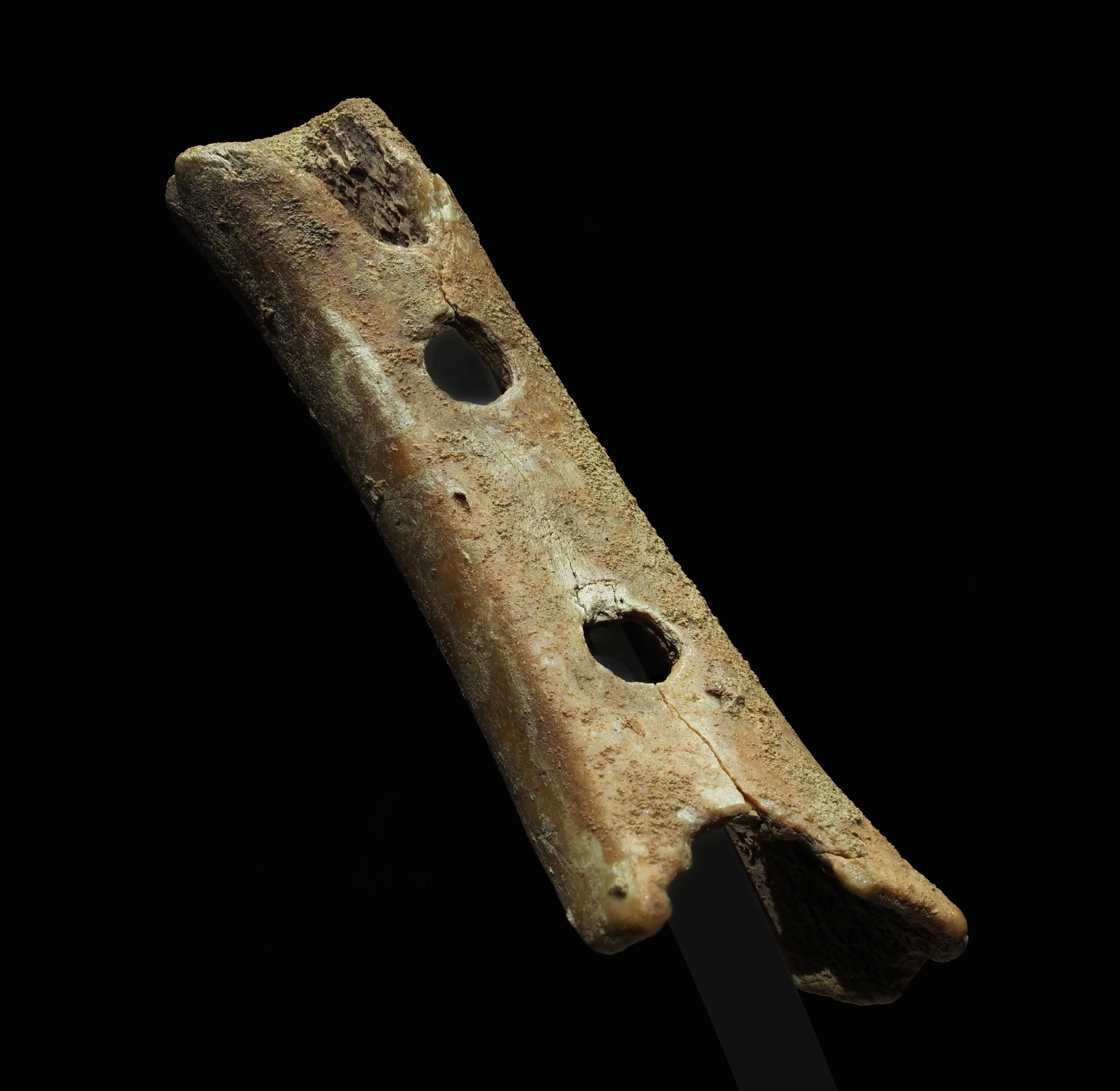
A pierced cave bear bone, possibly a flute made by Neanderthals dating to the Late Pleistocene.

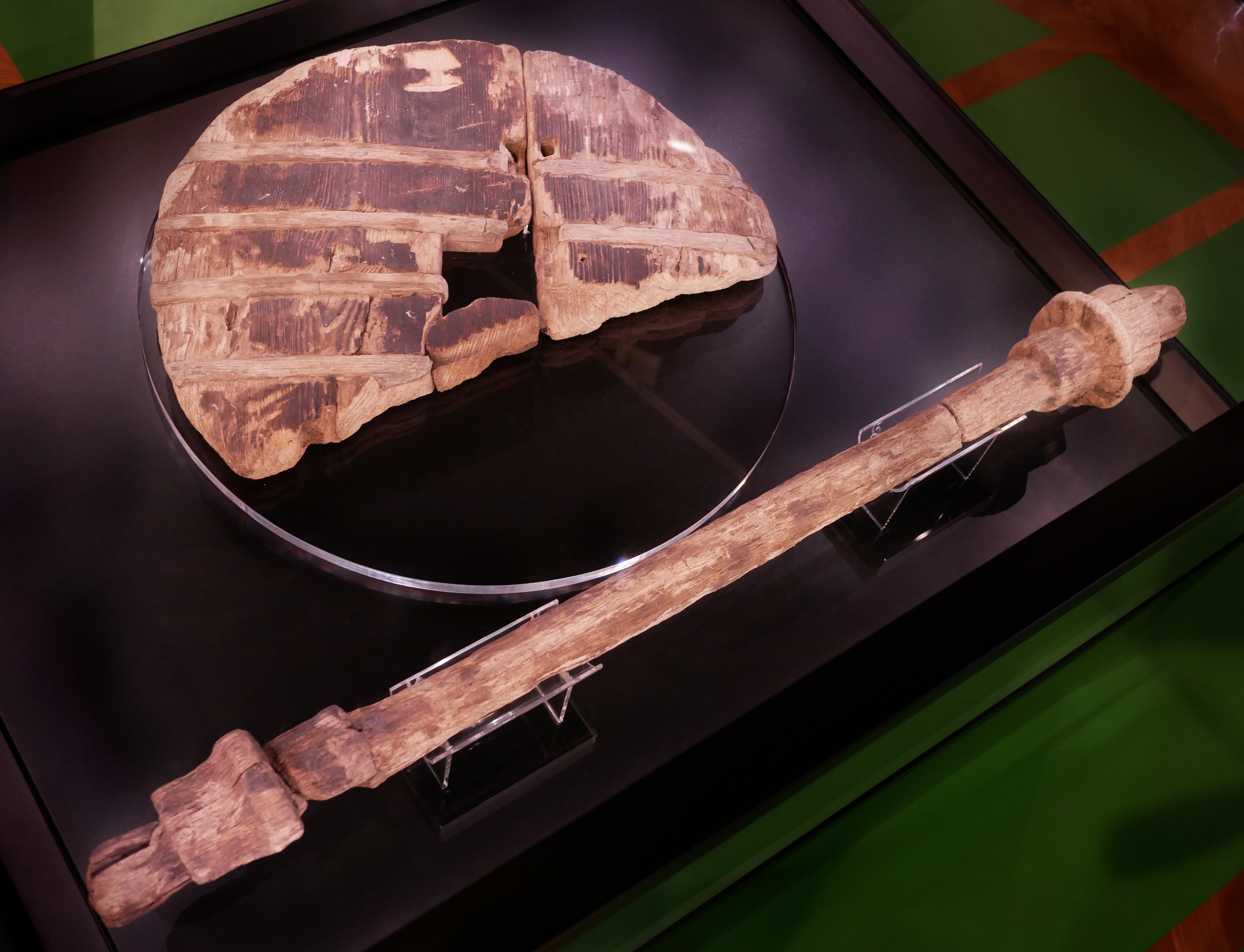
The Ljubljana Marshes Wheel, dating to the Neolithic period, is the oldest wooden wheel yet discovered.

The area later known as Slovenia has been inhabited since prehistoric times. Evidence of human habitation dates to around 250,000 years ago. A pierced cave bear bone, dating from 43100 ± 700 BP, found in 1995 in Divje Babe cave near Cerkno, is considered to be a kind of flute, and possibly the oldest musical instrument discovered in the world. In the 1920s and 1930s, Cro-Magnon artifacts, such as pierced bones, bone points, and a needle were found by archaeologist Srečko Brodar in Potok Cave.

In 2002, remains of pile dwellings over 4,500 years old were discovered in Ljubljana Marsh, later protected as a UNESCO World Heritage Site, along with the Ljubljana Marshes Wooden Wheel, the world's oldest wooden wheel. It shows that wooden wheels appeared contemporaneously in Mesopotamia and Europe. In the transition period from the Bronze Age to the Iron Age, the Urnfield culture flourished. Archaeological remains from the Hallstatt period, particularly in southeastern Slovenia, among them situlas in Novo Mesto, the "Town of Situlas".

==== Roman era ====
During Roman times, the area of modern-day Slovenia was divided between Venetia et Histria (region X of Roman Italia in the classification of Augustus) and the imperial provinces Pannonia and Noricum. The Romans established strategic urban posts at Emona (Ljubljana), Poetovio (Ptuj), and Celeia (Celje); and constructing major trade and military roads to connect Italy with Pannonia. By the 4th and 5th centuries, the region became a geopolitical flashpoint. In 394, the historic Battle of the Frigidus took place in the Vipava Valley, where Eastern Emperor Theodosius I defeated German usurper Eugenius. As the western empire weakened in the 5th and 6th centuries, the area was subject to invasions by Huns and Germanic tribes during their incursions into Italy. To protect the Italian heartland, the Romans built the Claustra Alpium Iuliarum (defensive line of towers and walls).

==== Slavic settlement ====
The Slavic tribes migrated to the Alpine area after the westward departure of the Lombards (the last Germanic tribe) in 568 and, under intense pressure from Avars, established a Slavic settlement in the Eastern Alps. From 623 to 624 (or possibly 626) onwards, King Samo united the Alpine and Western Slavs against both the Avars and Germanic peoples and established what is referred to as Samo's Kingdom. After its disintegration following Samo's death around 658, the ancestors of the Slovenes formed independent geopolitical entities: duchy of Carantania, and Carniola, later duchy Carniola. While the Avars temporarily reclaimed surrounding territories, Frankish King Charlemagne decisively defeated them in 803, bringing the entire region under Western European influence.

=== Middle Ages ===
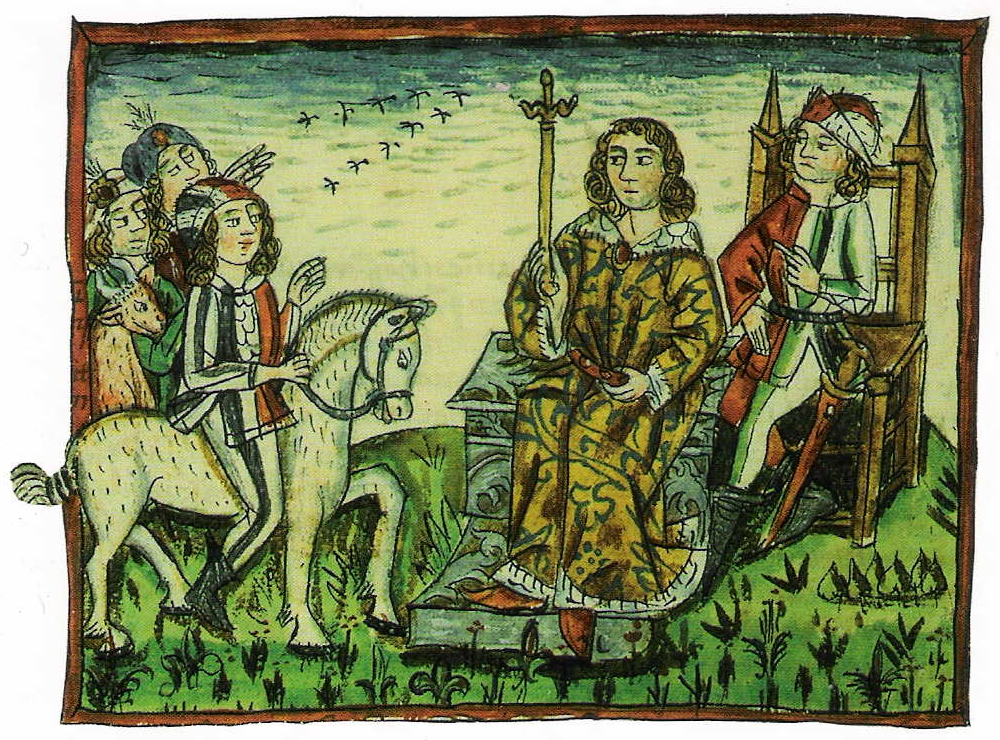
A depiction of an ancient democratic ritual of Slovene-speaking tribes, which took place on the Prince's Stone in Slovene until 1414.

The Carantanians, one of the ancestral groups of the modern Slovenes, particularly the Carinthian Slovenes, were the first Slavic people to accept Christianity. They were mostly Christianized by Irish missionaries, among them Modestus, known as the "Apostle of Carantanians". This process, together with the Christianization of the Bavarians, was later described in the memorandum known as the Conversio Bagoariorum et Carantanorum, which is thought to have overemphasized the role of the Church of Salzburg in the Christianization process over similar efforts of the Patriarchate of Aquileia.

In the mid-8th century, Carantania became a vassal duchy under the rule of the Bavarians, who began spreading Christianity. Three decades later, the Carantanians were incorporated, together with the Bavarians, into the Carolingian Empire. During the same period, Carniola also came under the Franks and was Christianized from Aquileia. Following the anti-Frankish rebellion of Liudewit at the beginning of the 9th century, the Franks removed the Carantanian princes, replacing them with their own border dukes. Consequently, the Frankish feudal system reached the Slovene territory.

After the victory of Emperor Otto I over the Magyars in 955, Slovene territory was divided into multiple border regions of the Holy Roman Empire. Carantania was elevated into the Duchy of Carinthia in 976.

By the 11th century, Germanization of the area that later became Lower Austria effectively isolated Slovene-inhabited territory from the other western Slavs, speeding up the development of the Slavs of Carantania and of Carniola into an independent Carantanian/Carniolans/Slovene ethnic group. By the High Middle Ages, Carniola, Styria, Carinthia, Gorizia, Trieste, and Istria developed from the border regions and were incorporated into the medieval Holy Roman Empire. The consolidation and formation of these lands took place in the period between the 11th and 14th centuries and were led by feudal families, such as the Dukes of Spanheim, the Counts of Gorizia, the Counts of Celje, and, finally, the House of Habsburg. In a parallel process, an intensive Germanization significantly diminished the extent of Slovene-speaking areas. By the 15th century, the Slovene ethnic territory was reduced.

In 1335, Henry of Gorizia, Duke of Carinthia, Landgrave of Carniola and Count of Tyrol, died without a male heir. His daughter Margaret was able to keep the County of Tyrol, while the Wittelsbach emperor Louis IV passed Carinthia and the Carniolan march to Habsburg Duke Albert II of Austria, whose mother, Elisabeth of Carinthia, was a sister of the late Duke Henry of Gorizia. Therefore, most of the territory that later became Slovenia emerged as a hereditary land of the Habsburg monarchy. As with the other component parts of the Habsburg monarchy, Carinthia and Carniola remained semi-autonomous states with their own constitutional structures.

The Counts of Celje, a local feudal family that in 1436 acquired the title of state princes, were powerful competitors of the house of Habsburg for some time. This large dynasty, important at a European level, had its seat in Slovene territory, but died out in 1456. Its large estates subsequently became the property of the Habsburgs, who retained control until the beginning of the 20th century. Patria del Friuli ruled the western portion of the lands that would later become Slovenia until Venetian takeover in 1420.

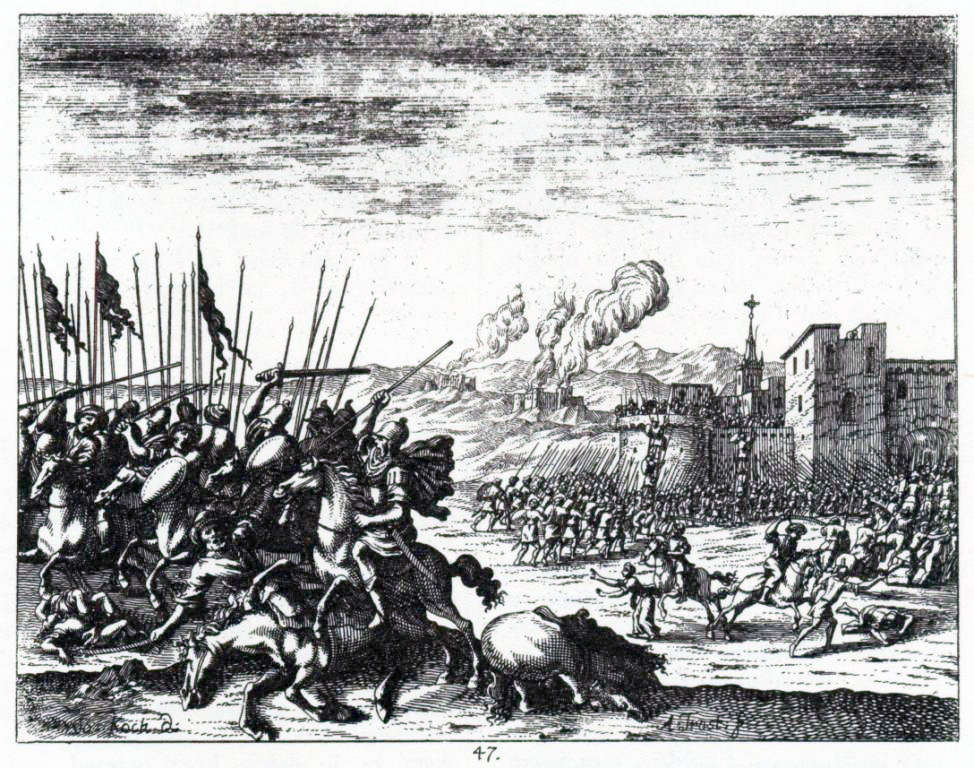
The Ottoman army battling the Habsburgs during the Great Turkish War in the area that would later become Slovenia.

At the end of the Middle Ages, Slovene Lands suffered a serious economic and demographic setback because of the Turkish raids. In 1515, a peasant revolt spread across Slovene territory. In 1572 and 1573, the Croatian-Slovenian peasant revolt wrought havoc throughout the wider region. Such uprisings, which often met with bloody defeats, continued throughout the 17th century.

=== Early modern period ===
After the dissolution of the Republic of Venice in 1797, Venetian Slovenia passed to the Austrian Empire. Slovene Lands were successively part of the Napoleonic Illyrian Provinces, the Austrian Empire, and Austria-Hungary. Slovenes inhabited most of Carniola, the southern part of the duchies of Carinthia and Styria, the northern and eastern areas of the Austrian Littoral, as well as Prekmurje in the Kingdom of Hungary. Industrialization was accompanied by construction of railroads to link cities and markets, but urbanization was limited.

Due to limited opportunities, between 1880 and 1910 emigration was extensive; around 300,000 Slovenes (1 in 6) left, mostly to the United States, but also to South America (mostly Argentina), Germany, Egypt, and to larger cities in Austria-Hungary, especially Vienna and Graz. Literacy was high, at 80–90%.

The 19th century saw a revival of Slovene culture, accompanied by a Romantic nationalist quest for cultural and political autonomy. The idea of a United Slovenia, first advanced during the revolutions of 1848, became the common platform of most Slovene parties and political movements in Austria-Hungary. During the same period, Yugoslavism, an ideology stressing the unity of all South Slavic peoples, spread as a reaction to Pan-German nationalism and Italian irredentism.

==== World War I ====
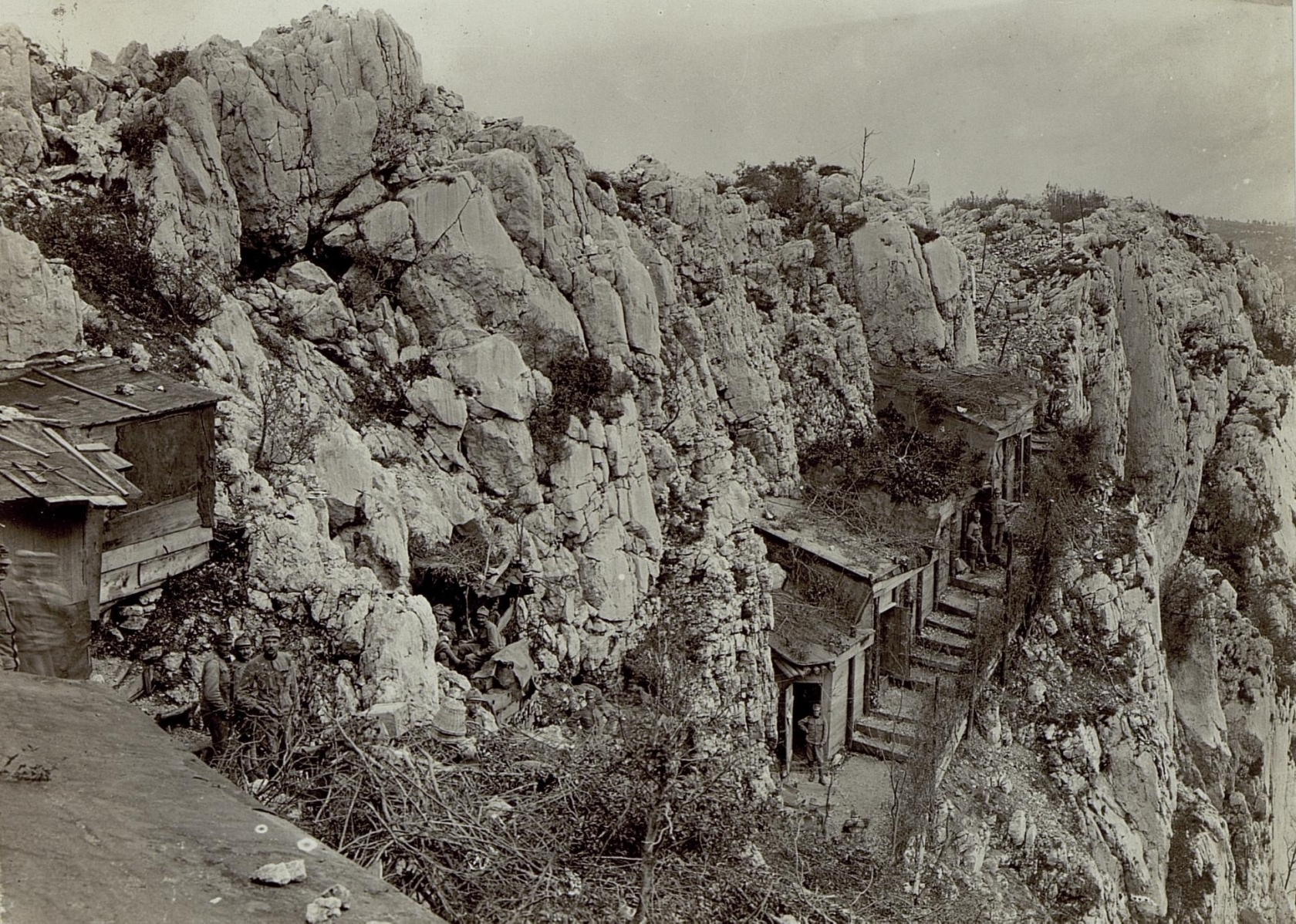
The Battles of the Isonzo took place mostly in rugged mountainous areas above the Soča River.

World War I brought heavy casualties to Slovenes, particularly in the twelve Battles of the Isonzo. Hundreds of thousands of Slovene conscripts were drafted into the Austro-Hungarian Army and over 30,000 of them were killed. Hundreds of thousands of Slovenes from Princely County of Gorizia and Gradisca were resettled in refugee camps in Italy and Austria. While refugees in Austria received decent treatment, those in Italian camps were treated as state enemies, and several thousand died of malnutrition and diseases between 1915 and 1918. Entire areas of the Slovene Littoral were destroyed.

The Treaty of Rapallo of 1920 left approximately 327,000 Slovenes in Italy. After fascists took power in Italy, they subjected Slovenes to a policy of violent Fascist Italianization. This caused the mass emigration of Slovenes, especially the middle class, from the Slovene Littoral and Trieste to Yugoslavia and South America. Those who remained organized connected networks of passive and armed resistance. The best known was the militant anti-fascist organization TIGR, formed in 1927 to fight in the Julian March.

=== State of Slovenes, Croats and Serbs ===
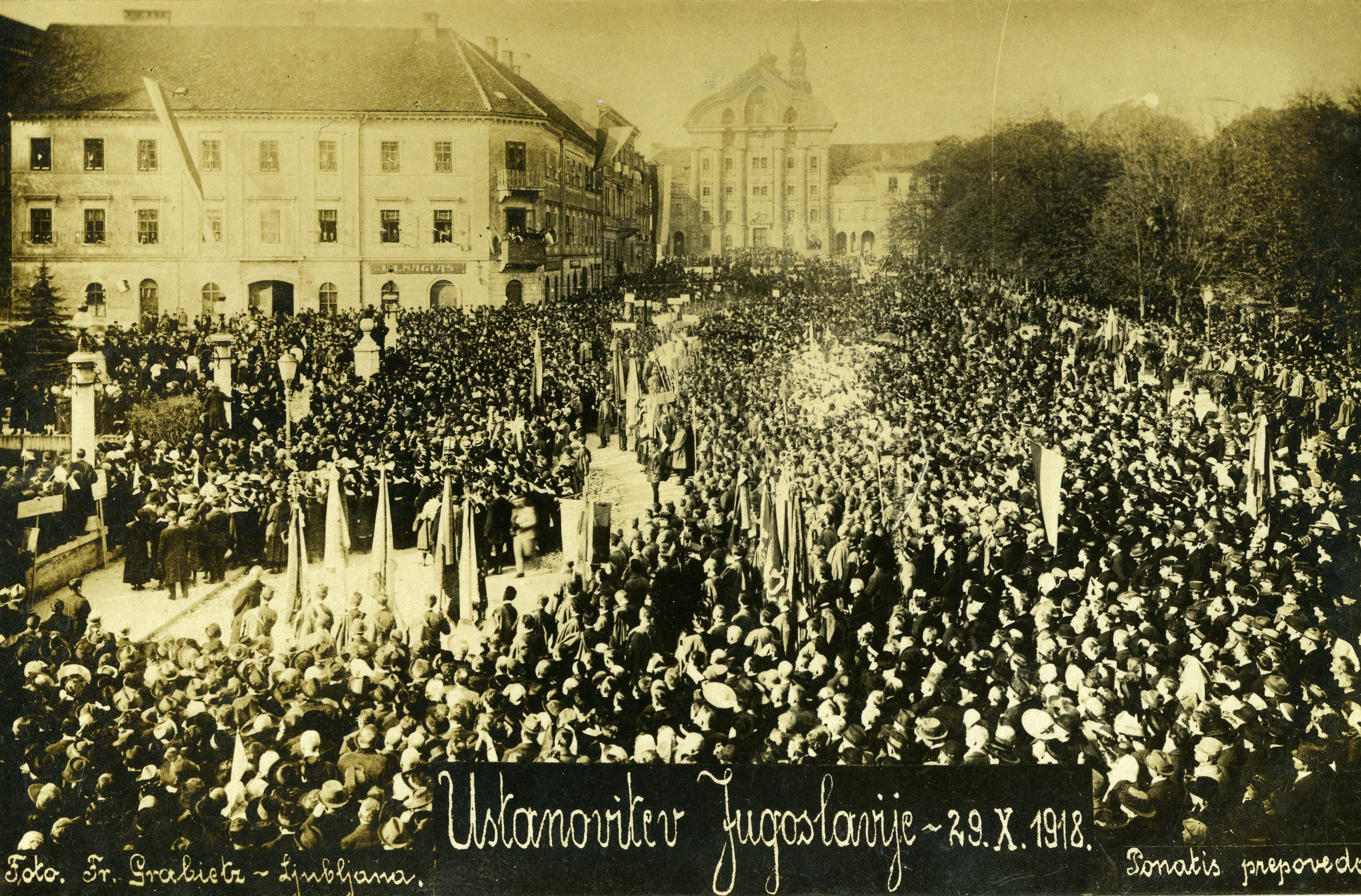
The proclamation of the State of Slovenes, Croats, and Serbs at Congress Square in Ljubljana on 29 October, 1918.

The Slovene People's Party launched a movement for self-determination, demanding the creation of a semi-independent South Slavic state under Habsburg rule. The proposal was picked up by most Slovene parties, and a mass mobilization of Slovene civil society, known as the Declaration Movement, followed. This demand was rejected by Austrian elites, but following the dissolution of the Austro-Hungarian Empire after World War I, the National Council of Slovenes, Croats and Serbs took power in Zagreb on 6 October 1918. On 29 October, independence was declared by a national gathering in Ljubljana and by the Croatian parliament, declaring the establishment of the new State of Slovenes, Croats, and Serbs.

=== Kingdom of Serbs, Croats, and Slovenes (later the Kingdom of Yugoslavia) ===
On 1 December 1918, the State of Slovenes, Croats, and Serbs merged with Serbia, becoming part of the new Kingdom of Serbs, Croats, and Slovenes; in 1929, it was renamed the Kingdom of Yugoslavia. The area that later became Slovenia, as the most industrialized and westernized compared to other less developed parts of Yugoslavia, became the main centre of industrial production. Slovene industrial production was four times greater than Serbia's and 22 times greater than North Macedonia. The interwar period brought further industrialization in the area, with rapid economic growth in the 1920s, followed by a relatively successful economic adjustment to the 1929 economic crisis and Great Depression.

Although Slovenia was not an autonomous administrative unit between 1921 and 1941, the Drava Banovina of the Kingdom of Yugoslavia was frequently called simply "Slovenia", even in some official documents.

Following a plebiscite in October 1920, the Slovene-speaking southern Carinthia was ceded to Austria. With the Treaty of Trianon, the Kingdom of Yugoslavia was awarded the mostly Slovene-inhabited Prekmurje region, formerly part of Austria-Hungary. Slovenes living in territories that fell under the rule of the neighbouring states—Italy, Austria, and Hungary—were subjected to assimilation.

=== World War II and annexation ===
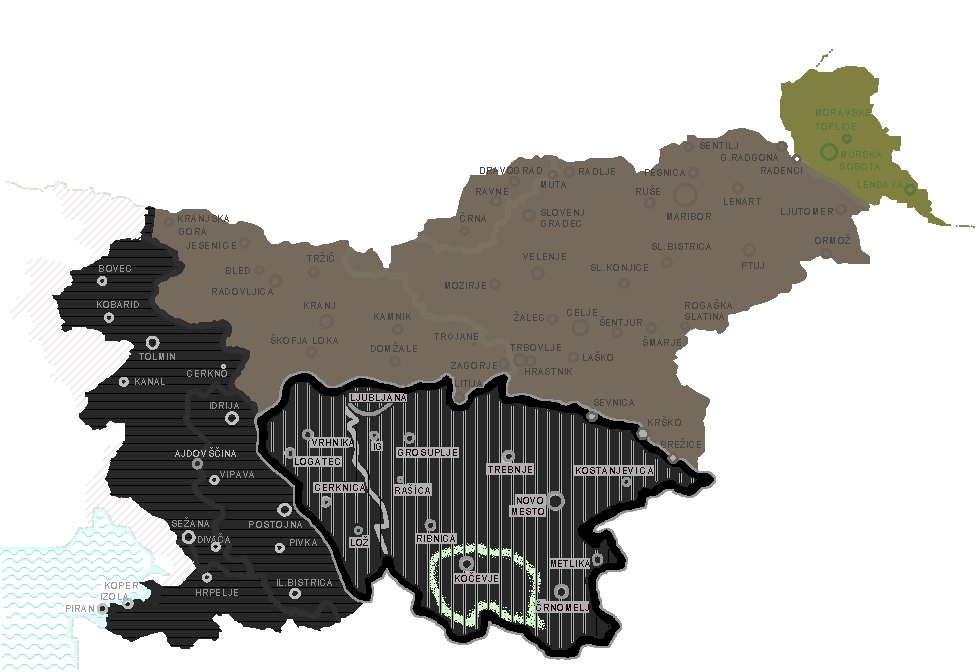
During World War II, Nazi Germany and Hungary annexed northern areas (brown and green, respectively), and Fascist Italy annexed the southeastern area (the black western part had been annexed by Italy in 1920 with the Treaty of Rapallo). Six villages (not marked) south of Brežice were also incorporated into the Independent State of Croatia. After 1943, Germany also occupied the area that Italy had annexed.

Yugoslavia's Drava province was divided between four countries during World War II. The bulk of the territory was annexed by Nazi Germany and Fascist Italy. In addition, the smaller Prekmurje region in the northeast was annexed to Hungary, and some villages in the Lower Sava Valley were incorporated into the newly created Independent State of Croatia (NDH), a Nazi puppet state. Axis forces invaded Yugoslavia in April 1941 and conquered the country in a few weeks. The southern part, including Ljubljana, was annexed to Italy, while Nazi Germany occupied the northern and eastern parts. The Nazis planned the annexation and ethnic cleansing of these areas, and they resettled or expelled the local Slovene civilian population. They sent 10,000 Slovenes to the NDH and 7,500 to Nedić's Serbia, another Nazi German collaborationist puppet state. The occupation government also sent over 10,000 Jews to Nazi concentration camps. Some 46,000 Slovenes were deported to Germany, including children taken from their parents and adopted into German families. During this same period, the ethnic Germans in the Gottschee enclave within the Italian annexation zone were resettled to the areas recently emptied of their Slovene population. Around 30,000 to 40,000 Slovene men were conscripted into the Wehrmacht and sent to the Eastern front. The Slovene language was banned in schools, and its use in public life was curbed.

The south-central portion of the region was annexed by Fascist Italy and renamed the Province of Ljubljana. The Slovenian National Liberation Front was organized there in April 1941. Led by the Communist Party, it formed the Slovene Partisan units that were part of the Yugoslav Partisans led by Josip Broz Tito.

After the resistance started in summer 1941, Italian violence against the civilian population escalated. The Italian authorities deported some 25,000 people to concentration camps, numbering 7.5% of the population of their zone. The most infamous camps were Rab and Gonars. To counter the Communist-led insurgence, the Italians sponsored local anti-guerrilla units, formed mostly by the local conservative Catholic Slovene population that resented the revolutionary partisans' violence. After the Italian armistice of September 1943, the Nazis took over the province of Ljubljana and the Slovenian Littoral, incorporating them into the Operation Zone of Adriatic Coastal Region. They united the Slovene anti-Communist counter-insurgence into the Slovene Home Guard and appointed a puppet regime in the province of Ljubljana. The anti-Nazi resistance, however, expanded and created its own administrative structures as the basis for Slovene statehood within a federal and socialist Yugoslavia.

In 1945, Yugoslavia was liberated by the partisan resistance and soon became a socialist federation known as the People's Federal Republic of Yugoslavia.

Approximately 8% of the Slovene population died during World War II. The small Jewish community, mostly in the Prekmurje region, was destroyed in 1944 in the holocaust of Hungarian Jews. The German-speaking minority, amounting to 2.5% of the Slovenian population prior to the war, was either expelled or killed in the war's aftermath. Hundreds of Istrian Italians and Slovenes who were members of fascist and collaborationist forces, alongside civilians presumed to oppose communism, were killed in the foibe massacres, and more than 25,000 fled or were expelled from Slovenian Istria. Around 130,000 persons, mostly political and military opponents, were executed in May and June 1945.

=== Socialist Republic of Slovenia ===
During the re-establishment of Yugoslavia in World War II, the Socialist Republic of Slovenia was created and became part of Federal Yugoslavia. Yugoslavia was a socialist state, but because of the 1948 Tito–Stalin split, Yugoslavian economic and personal freedoms were much broader than in the Eastern Bloc countries. In 1947, the Slovene Littoral and the western half of Inner Carniola, which had been annexed by Italy after World War I, returned to Slovenia.

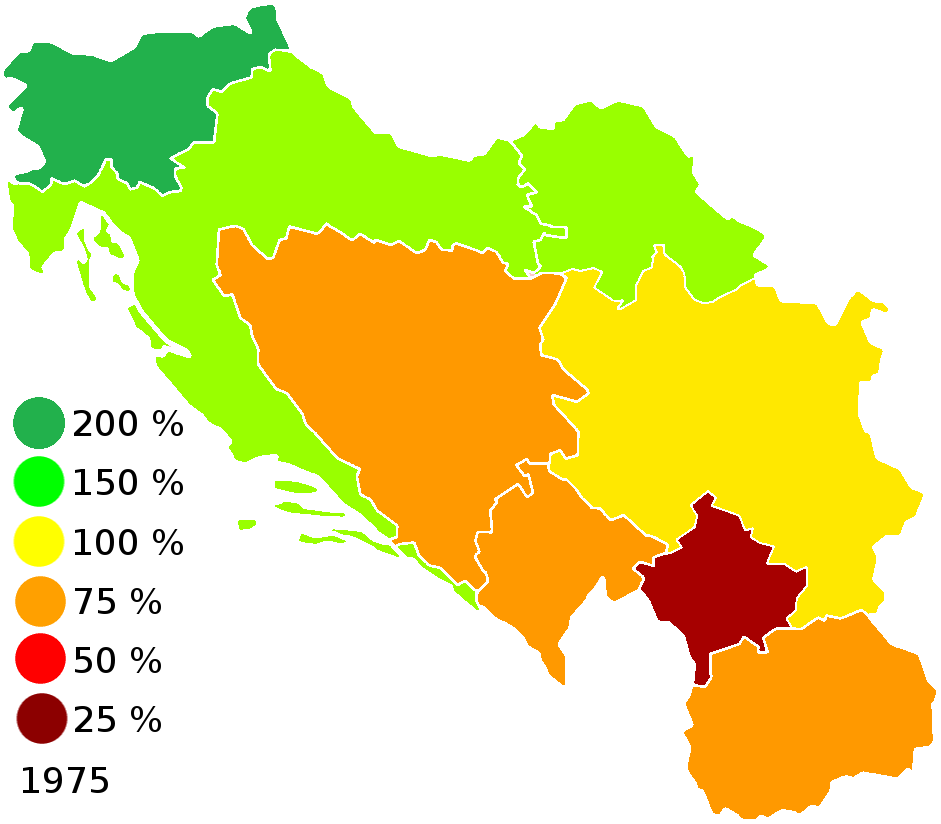
Average strength of Yugoslav economy as a deviation from the main (Yugoslavia = 100 %) indicator 1975. SR Slovenia (dark green) was, along with SR Croatia and SAP Vojvodina (light green), the richest entity of SFR Yugoslavia.

After the failure of forced collectivisation that was attempted from 1949 to 1953, a policy of gradual economic liberalisation, known as workers' self-management, was introduced under the advice and supervision of Slovene Marxist and Communist leader Edvard Kardelj, the main ideologue of the Titoist path. Suspected opponents of this policy were persecuted and thousands were sent to Goli Otok (joining opponents from the Tito-Stalin split, which developed at the same time).

In the 1950s, Slovenia's economy industrialized rapidly. With further economic decentralization in 1965–66, Slovenia's domestic product was 2.5 times the average of Yugoslav republics. JAT Airlines was the flag carrier, and it grew to become one of the leading airlines in Europe both by fleet size and destinations. By the 1970s, more airlines were created, including Slovenian Adria Airways, mostly focused on the tourist industry.

In the late 1950s, culture liberalized and unlimited border crossing into western countries was allowed, for Yugoslavs and for foreigners. In 1956, Josip Broz Tito, together with other leaders, founded the Non-Aligned Movement. While being a Communist country, after the Tito–Stalin split Yugoslavia adopted military neutrality and non-alignment. Until the 1980s, Slovenia enjoyed relatively broad autonomy within the federation. It was Europe's most liberal communist state, and its passport allowed Yugoslavs to travel to the most world countries of any socialist country during the Cold War. Many people worked in western countries.

Opposition to the regime was mostly limited to intellectual and literary circles, and became more vocal after Tito's death in 1980 when the economic and political situation in Yugoslavia became strained. Political disputes around economic measures were echoed in public sentiment, as many Slovenians felt that the government was economically exploiting them to sustain an expensive and inefficient federal administration.

=== Slovenian Spring, democracy and independence ===
In 1987, a group of intellectuals demanded Slovene independence in the 57th edition of the magazine Nova revija. Demands for democratisation and more Slovenian independence grew. A mass democratic movement, coordinated by the Committee for the Defence of Human Rights, pushed the Communists towards democratic reforms.

In September 1989, various constitutional amendments introduced parliamentary democracy to Slovenia. On 7 March 1990, the Slovenian Assembly changed the official name of the state to the Republic of Slovenia. In April 1990, the first democratic election in Slovenia took place, and the united opposition movement (DEMOS) led by Jože Pučnik emerged victorious.

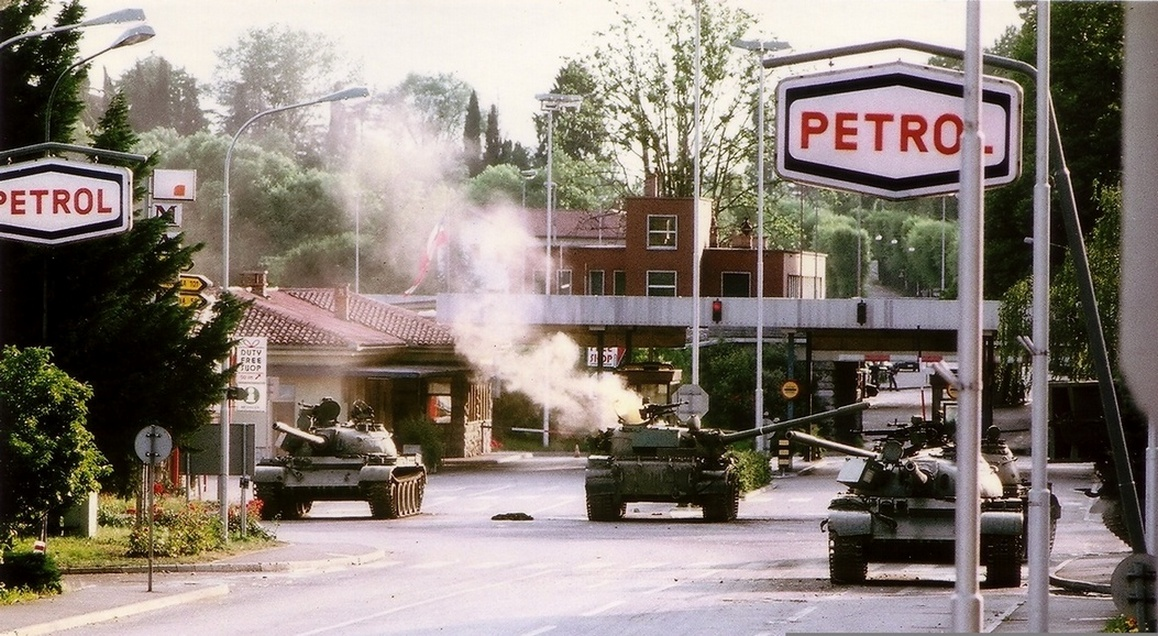
Slovenian Territorial Defense Units counterattacking a Yugoslav People's Army tank, which entered Slovenia during the Ten-Day War, 1991.

The initial revolutionary events in Slovenia pre-dated the Revolutions of 1989 in Eastern Europe by almost a year, but went largely unnoticed outside the country. On 23 December 1990, more than 88% of the electorate voted for a sovereign and independent Slovenia. On 25 June 1991, Slovenia became independent. In the early morning of 27 June, the Yugoslav People's Army dispatched forces to prevent further measures for the establishment of a new country, which led to the Ten-Day War. On 7 July, the Brioni Agreement was signed, implementing a truce and a three-month halt of the enforcement of Slovenia's independence. At the end of the month, the last Yugoslav Army soldiers left Slovenia.

In December 1991, a new constitution was adopted, followed in 1992 by the laws on denationalisation and privatisation. The members of the European Union (EU) recognised Slovenia as an independent state on 15 January 1992, and the United Nations accepted it as a member on 22 May 1992. Slovenia joined the EU on 1 May 2004. Slovenia has one Commissioner in the European Commission, and seven Slovene parliamentarians were elected to the European Parliament at elections on 13 June 2004. In 2004 Slovenia also joined NATO. Slovenia subsequently succeeded in meeting the Maastricht criteria and joined the Eurozone (the first transition country to do so) on 1 January 2007. It was the first post-Communist country to hold the Presidency of the Council of the European Union, for the first six months of 2008. On 21 July 2010, it became a member of the OECD.

Disillusionment with domestic socio-economic elites at municipal and national levels was expressed at the 2012–2013 Slovenian protests on a wider scale than in the smaller 15 October 2011 protests. Legal experts expressed the need for changes in the system that would limit political arbitrariness.

== Geography ==
Slovenia is located in Central Europe, touching the eastern Alps and bordering the Mediterranean Sea. This locates Slovenia within the Mediterranean basin. It lies between latitudes 45° and 47° N, and longitudes 13° and 17° E. The 15th meridian east almost corresponds to the middle line of the country in the direction west–east. The Geometric Centre of the Republic of Slovenia is located at coordinates 46°07'11.8" N and 14°48'55.2" E. It lies in Slivna in the Municipality of Litija. Slovenia's highest peak, Triglav (2,864 m or 9,396 ft), has become a national symbol of Slovenia, featured on the national coat of arms and flag. The country's average height above sea level is 557 m (1,827 ft).

Four major European geographic regions meet in Slovenia: the Alps, the Dinarides, the Pannonian Plain, and the Mediterranean Sea. Despite its location on the shore of the Adriatic Sea near the Mediterranean Sea, most of Slovenia is in the Black Sea drainage basin. The Alps—including the Julian Alps, the Kamnik-Savinja Alps, and the Karawank chain, as well as the Pohorje massif—dominate Northern Slovenia along its long border with Austria. Slovenia's Adriatic coastline stretches approximately 47 kilometres (29 mi) from Italy to Croatia.

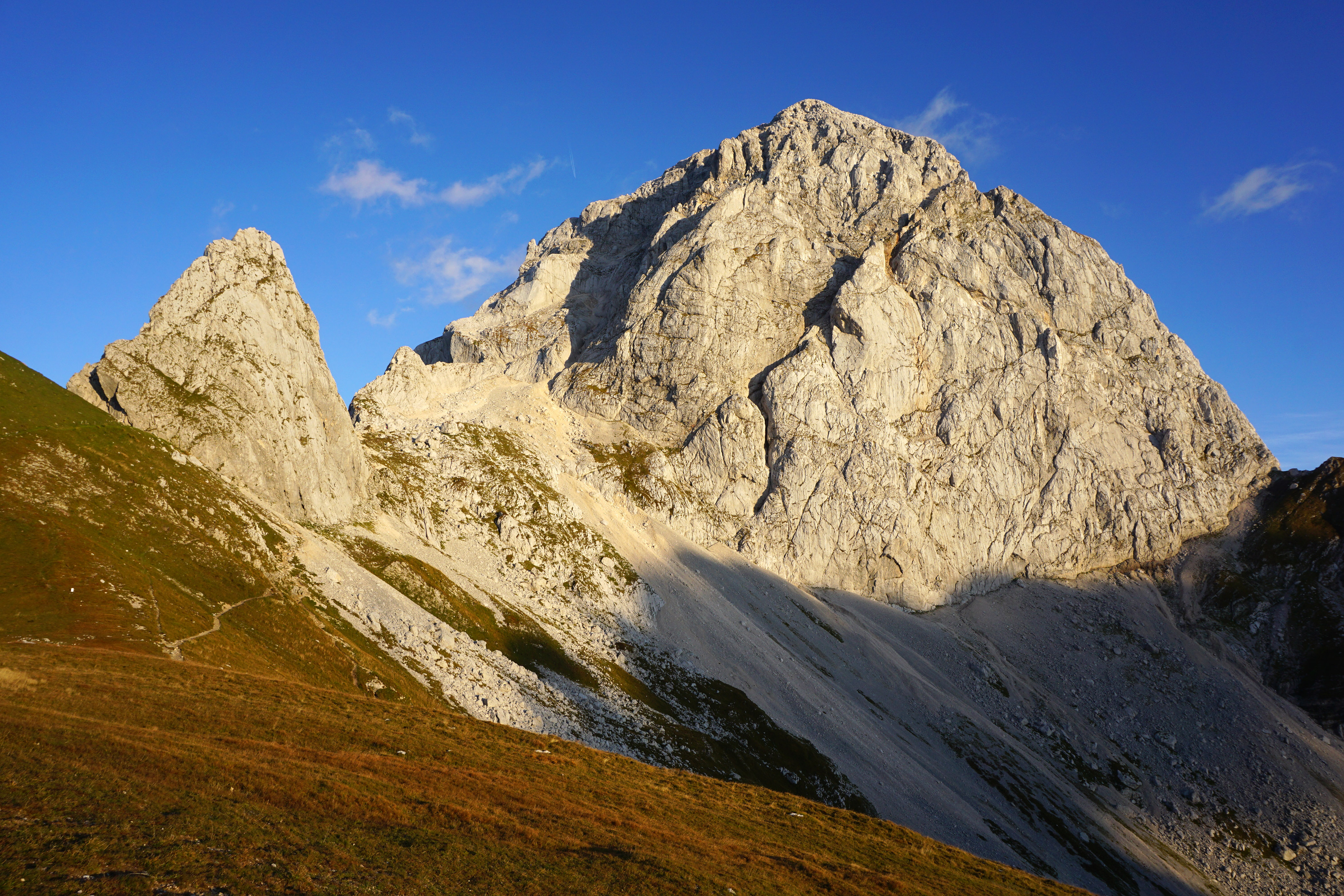
Mount Mangart, in the Julian Alps, is the third-highest peak in Slovenia, after Triglav and Škrlatica.

The term "Karst topography" refers to that of southwestern Slovenia's Karst Plateau, a limestone region of underground rivers, gorges, and caves, between Ljubljana and the Mediterranean Sea. On the Pannonian plain to the east and northeast, toward the Croatian and Hungarian borders, the landscape is essentially flat. However, most of Slovenia is hilly or mountainous, with around 90% of its land surface being 200 m (656 ft) or more above sea level.

As of 2020, 60.4% of Slovenia (12,380 km^{2} or 4,780 sq mi) is forested, ranking it second in Europe by percentage of area forested, after Finland. The areas are covered mostly by beech, fir-beech and beech-oak forests and have a relatively high production capacity. Remnants of old-growth forests are still to be found: the largest in the Kočevje area. Grassland covers 5,593 km^{2} (2,159 sq mi), and fields and gardens (954 km^{2} or 368 sq mi). There are 363 km^{2} (140 sq mi) of orchards and 216 km^{2} (83 sq mi) of vineyards.

=== Geology ===
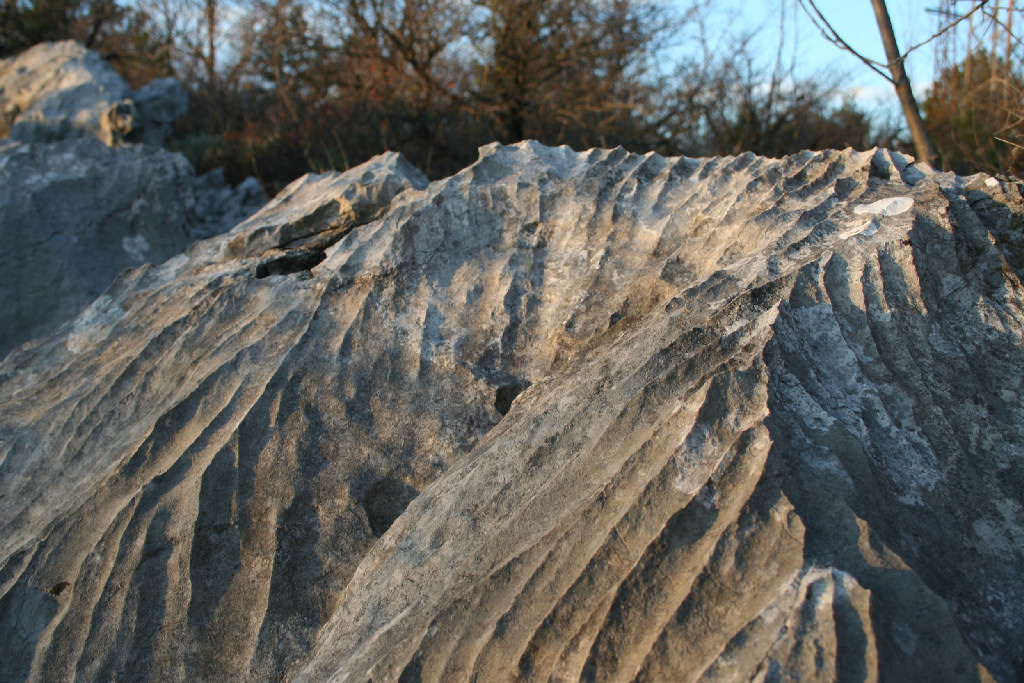
Solution runnels (also known as rillenkarren) are a karst feature on the Karst Plateau, as in many other karst areas of the world.

Slovenia is in a rather active seismic zone because of its position on the small Adriatic Plate, which is squeezed between the Eurasian Plate to the north and the African Plate to the south, and rotates counter-clockwise. Thus the country is at the junction of three important geotectonic units: the Alps to the north, the Dinaric Alps to the south and the Pannonian Basin to the east. Scientists have been able to identify 60 destructive earthquakes in the past. Additionally, a network of seismic stations is active throughout the country.

Many parts of Slovenia have a carbonate bedrock and extensive cave systems have developed.

=== Natural regions ===
The first regionalisations of Slovenia were made by geographers Anton Melik (1935–1936) and Svetozar Ilešič (1968). The newer regionalisation by Ivan Gams divided Slovenia in the following macroregions:

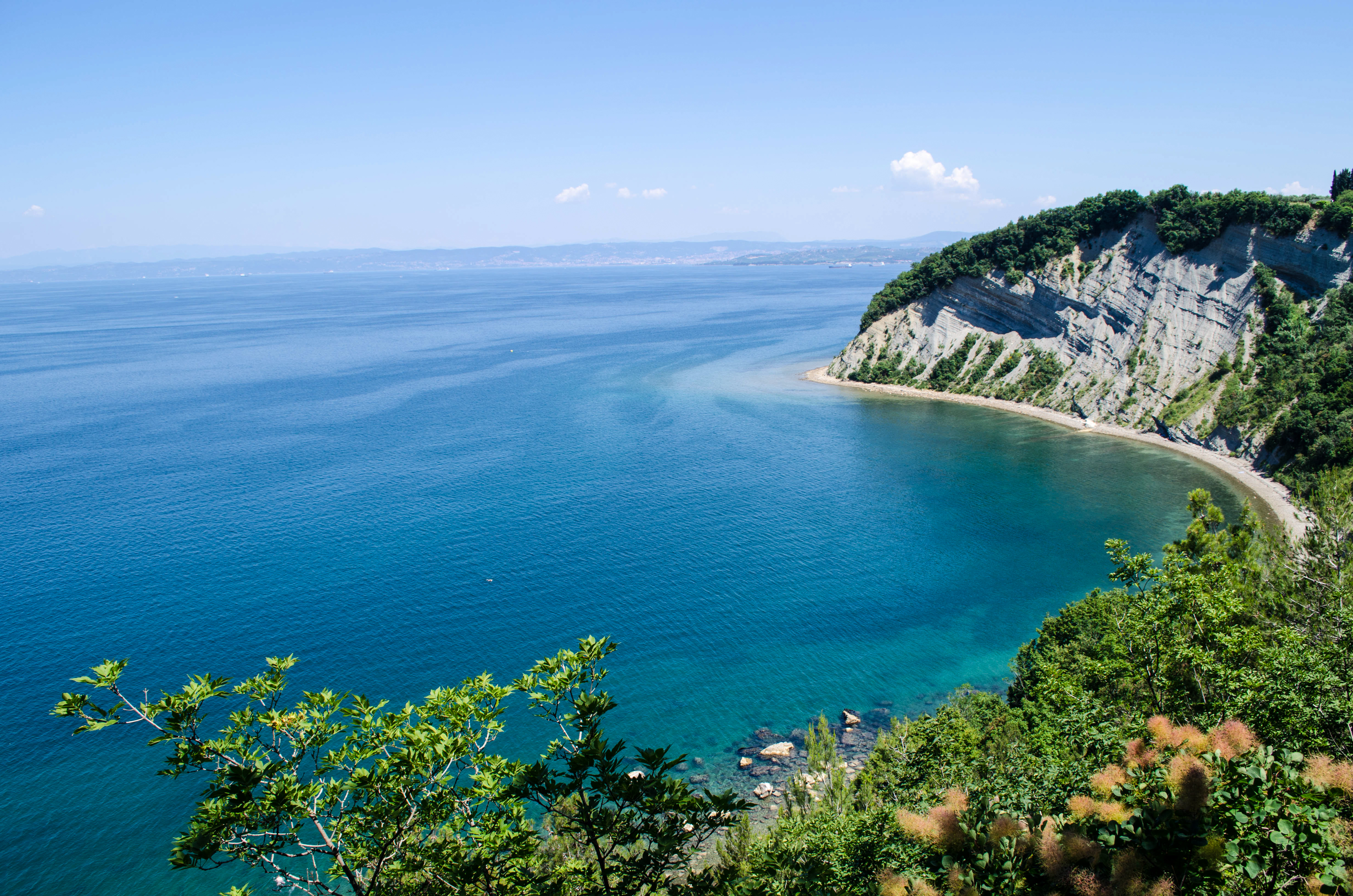
Slovenian coast with cliffs.

- The Alps (Alpe)
- The subalpine landscapes (predalpski svet)
- The Slovene Littoral or Submediterranean Slovenia (Primorje or submediteranska Slovenija)
- The Dinaric plateaus of the continental Slovenia (dinarske planote celinske Slovenije)
- The Subpannonian Slovenia (subpanonska Slovenija)

According to a newer natural geographic regionalisation, the country consists of four macroregions. These are the Alpine, the Mediterranean, the Dinaric, and the Pannonian landscapes. Macroregions are defined according to major relief units (the Alps, the Pannonian plain, the Dinaric mountains) and climate types (submediterranean, temperate continental, mountain climate). These are often quite interwoven.

Protected areas of Slovenia include national parks, regional parks, and nature parks, the largest of which is Triglav National Park. There are 286 Natura 2000 designated protected areas, which include 36% of the country's land area; the largest percentage among European Union states. Additionally, according to Yale University's Environmental Performance Index, Slovenia is considered a "strong performer" in environmental protection efforts.

=== Climate ===
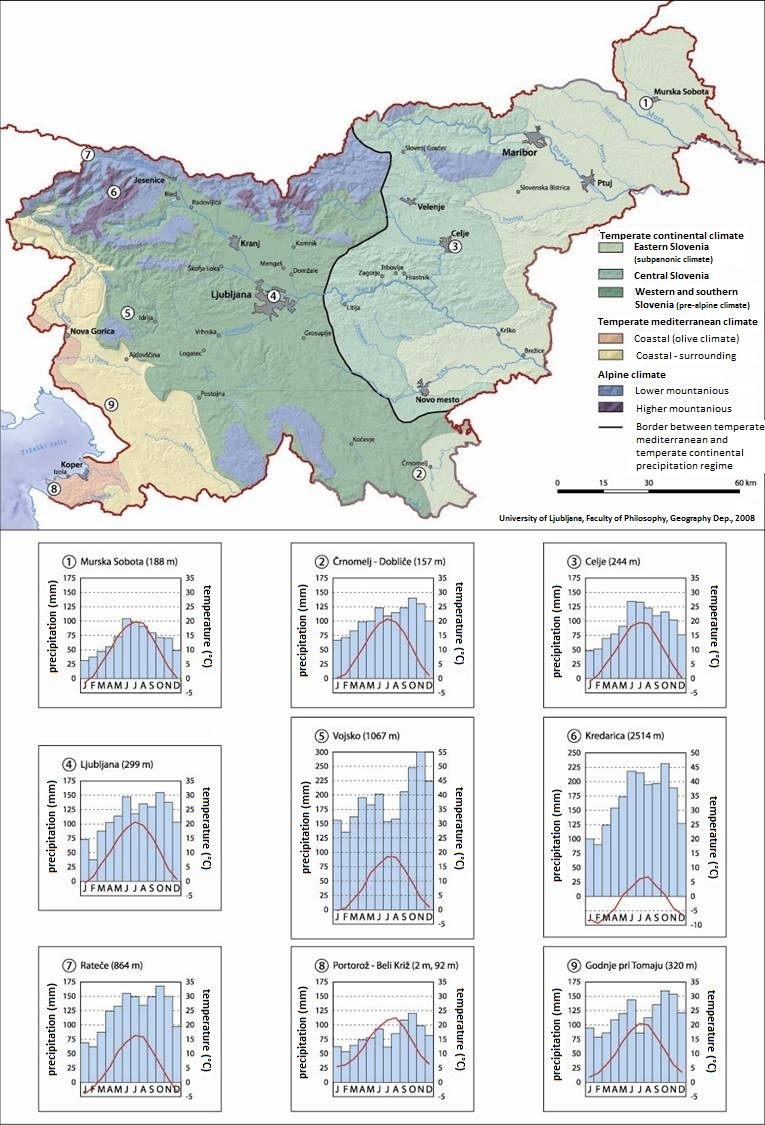
Climate types of Slovenia 1970–2000 and climographs for selected settlements.

Slovenia is located in temperate latitudes. The climate is also influenced by the variety of relief, and the influence of the Alps and the Adriatic Sea. In the northeast, the continental climate type with the greatest difference between winter and summer temperatures prevails. In the coastal region, there is a sub-Mediterranean climate. The effect of the sea on the temperature rates is also visible up the Soča Valley, while a severe Alpine climate is present in the high mountain regions. There is a strong interaction between these three climatic systems across most of the country.

Precipitation, often coming from the Gulf of Genoa, varies across the country as well, with over 3,500 mm (138 in) in some western regions and dropping down to 800 mm (31 in) in Prekmurje. Snow is quite frequent in winter, and the record snow cover in Ljubljana was recorded in 1952 at 146 cm (57 in).

Compared to Western Europe, Slovenia is not very windy, because it lies in the slipstream of the Alps. The average wind speeds are lower than in the plains of nearby countries. Due to the rugged terrain, local vertical winds with daily periods are present. Besides these, there are three winds of particular regional importance: the bora, the jugo, and the foehn. The jugo and the bora are characteristic of the Littoral. Whereas the jugo is humid and warm, the bora is usually cold and gusty. The foehn is typical of the Alpine regions in northern Slovenia. Generally present in Slovenia are the northeast wind, the southeast wind, and the north wind.

=== Waters ===
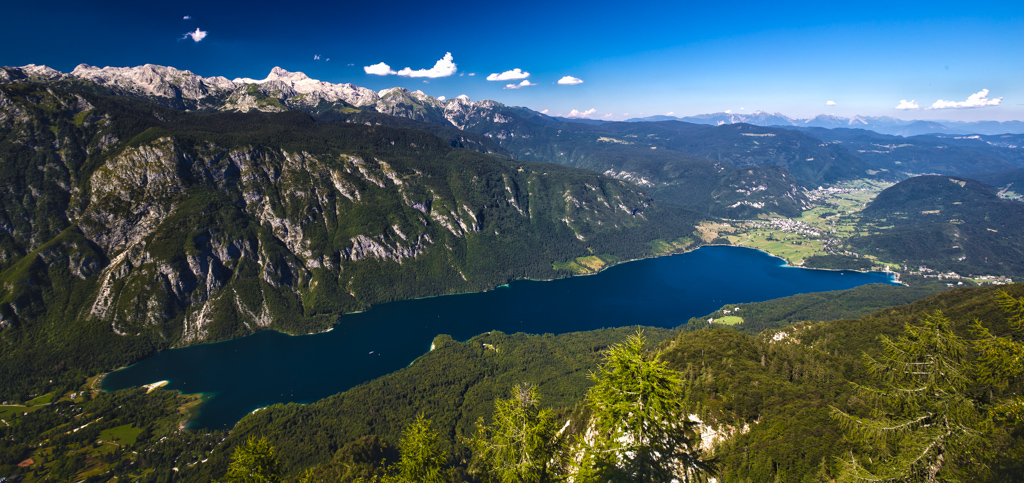
Lake Bohinj, the largest Slovenian lake and one of the two headwaters of the Sava River.

81% of the territory of Slovenia (16,423 square kilometers or 6,341 square miles) belongs to the Black Sea basin, with the remaining 19% (3,850 square kilometers or 1,490 square miles) lying within the Adriatic Sea basin. These watersheds are divided into sub-basins according to their central rivers: the Mura River basin, the Drava River basin, the Sava River basin with Kolpa River basin, and the basin of the Adriatic rivers. According to a Slovenia Environmental Agency report, in comparison with other developed countries, water quality in Slovenia is among the highest in Europe. This is because most of the rivers rise within Slovenia, but Slovenia still has problems with surface water and groundwater quality, especially in areas with industrial and municipal waste waters.

=== Biodiversity ===
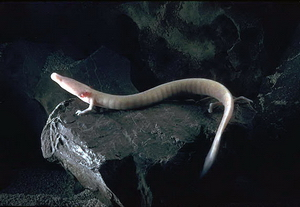
Olm can be found in the Postojna cave and other caves in the country.

Slovenia signed the Rio Convention on Biological Diversity on 13 June 1992 and became a party to the convention on 9 July 1996. It subsequently produced a National Biodiversity Strategy and Action Plan, which was received by the convention on 30 May 2002.

Slovenia is distinguished by an exceptionally wide variety of habitats, due to the contact of geological units and biogeographical regions, and due to human influences. The country is home to four terrestrial ecoregions: Dinaric Mountains mixed forests, Pannonian mixed forests, Alps conifer and mixed forests, and Illyrian deciduous forests. Around 12.5% of the territory is protected, with 35.5% in the Natura 2000 ecological network. In spite of these protections, however, diversity has been in decline due to pollution and environmental degradation. Slovenia had a 2019 Forest Landscape Integrity Index mean score of 3.78/10, ranking it 140th globally out of 172 countries.

==== Animals ====
The biological diversity of the country is high, with 1% of the world's organisms on 0.004% of the Earth's surface area. There are 75 mammal species, among them marmots, Alpine ibex, and chamois. There are numerous red deer, roe deer, boar, and hares. The edible dormouse is often found in the Slovenian beech forests. Trapping these animals is a long-standing tradition and part of Slovenian national identity.

Some important carnivores include the Eurasian lynx, European wildcats, foxes (especially the red fox), and European jackal. There are hedgehogs, martens, and snakes such as vipers and grass snakes. According to recent estimates, Slovenia has c. 40–60 wolves and about 450 brown bears.

Slovenia is home to an exceptionally diverse number of cave species, with a few tens of endemic species. Among the cave vertebrates, the only known one is the olm, living in Karst, Lower Carniola, and White Carniola.

The only regular species of cetaceans found in the northern Adriatic sea is the bottlenose dolphin (Tursiops truncatus).

There are a wide variety of birds, such as the tawny owl, the long-eared owl, the eagle-owl, hawks, and short-toed eagles. Other birds of prey have been recorded, as well as a growing number of ravens, crows and magpies migrating into Ljubljana and Maribor where they thrive. Other birds include black and green woodpeckers and the white stork, which nests mainly in Prekmurje.

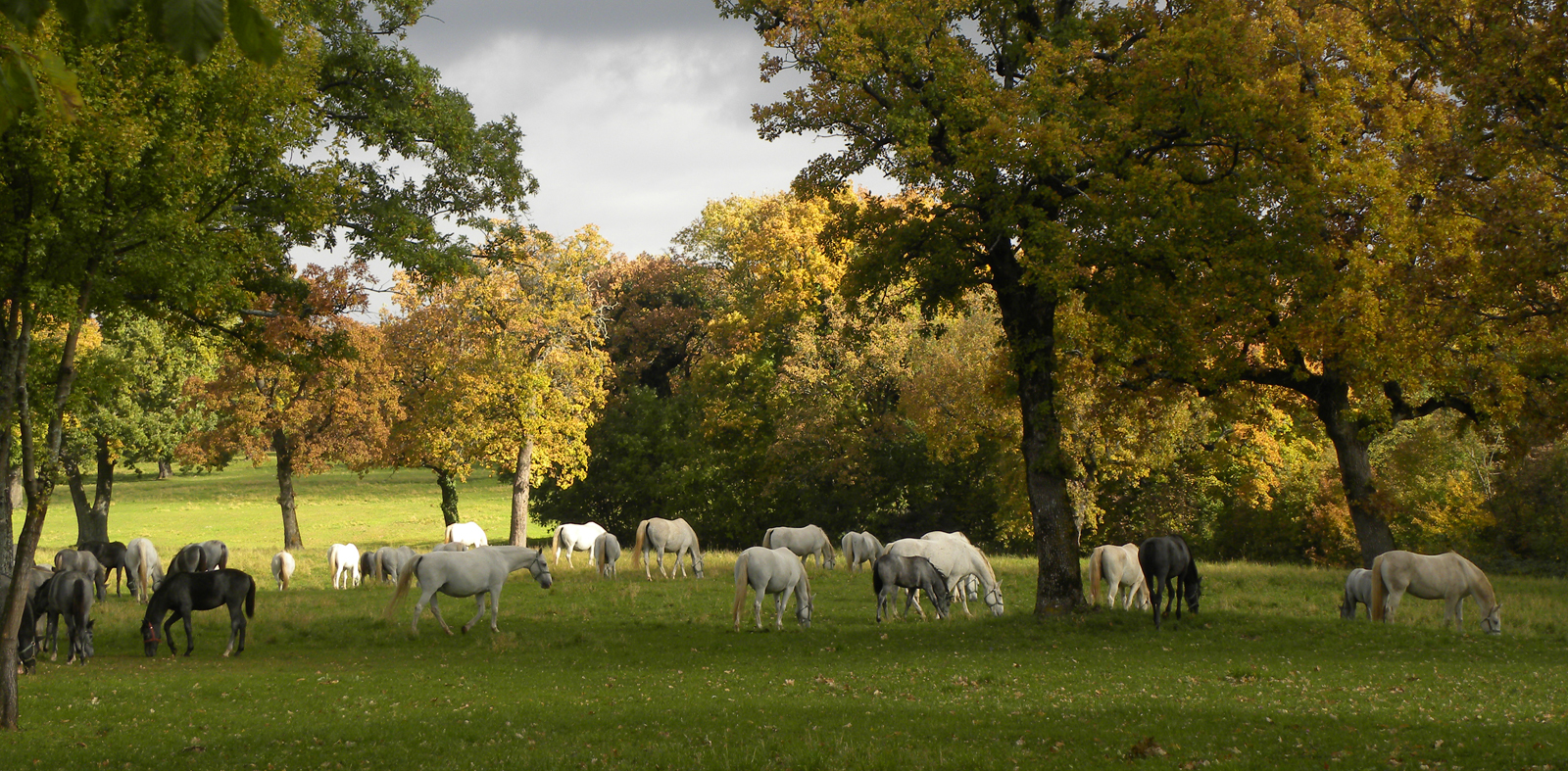
Modern Lipizzaner grazing.

There are 13 domestic animals native to Slovenia, of eight species (hen, pig, dog, horse, sheep, goat, honey bee, and cattle). Among these are the Karst Shepherd, the Carniolan honey bee, and the Lipizzan horse. The marble trout or marmorata (Salmo marmoratus) is an indigenous Slovenian fish. Extensive breeding programmes have been introduced to repopulate the marble trout into lakes and streams invaded by non-indigenous species of trout. Slovenia is also home to the wels catfish.

More than 2,400 fungal species have been recorded from Slovenia and, since that figure does not include lichen-forming fungi, the total number of Slovenian fungi already known is undoubtedly much higher. Many more remain to be discovered.

Slovenia is the second most-forested country in Europe, with 60.4% of the territory covered by forests. The forests are an important natural resource, and logging is kept to a minimum. In the interior of the country are typical Central European forests, predominantly oak and beech. In the mountains, spruce, fir, and pine are more common. Pine trees grow on the Karst Plateau, although only one-third of the region is covered by pine forest. The lime/linden tree, common in Slovenian forests, is a national symbol. The tree line is at 1,700 to 1,800 metres (5,600 to 5,900 feet).

In the Alps, flowers such as Daphne blagayana, gentians (Gentiana clusii, Gentiana froelichii), Primula auricula, edelweiss (the symbol of Slovene mountaineering), Cypripedium calceolus, Fritillaria meleagris (snake's head fritillary), and Pulsatilla grandis are found.

Slovenia is home to many plants from ethnobotanically useful groups. Of 59 known species of ethnobotanical importance, some species such as Aconitum napellus, Cannabis sativa, and Taxus baccata are restricted for use as per the Official Gazette of the Republic of Slovenia.

== Governance and politics ==
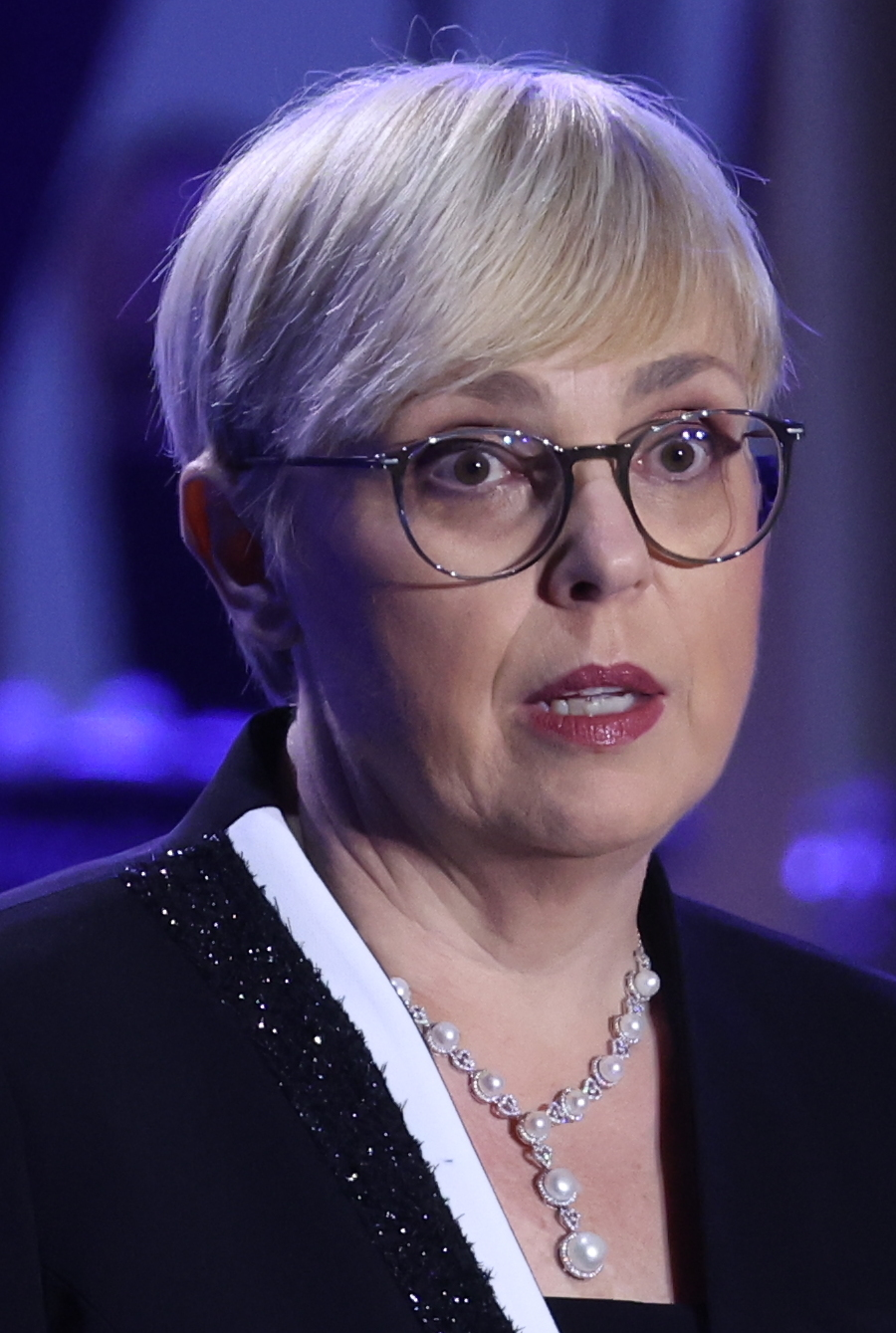
Nataša Pirc Musar
President

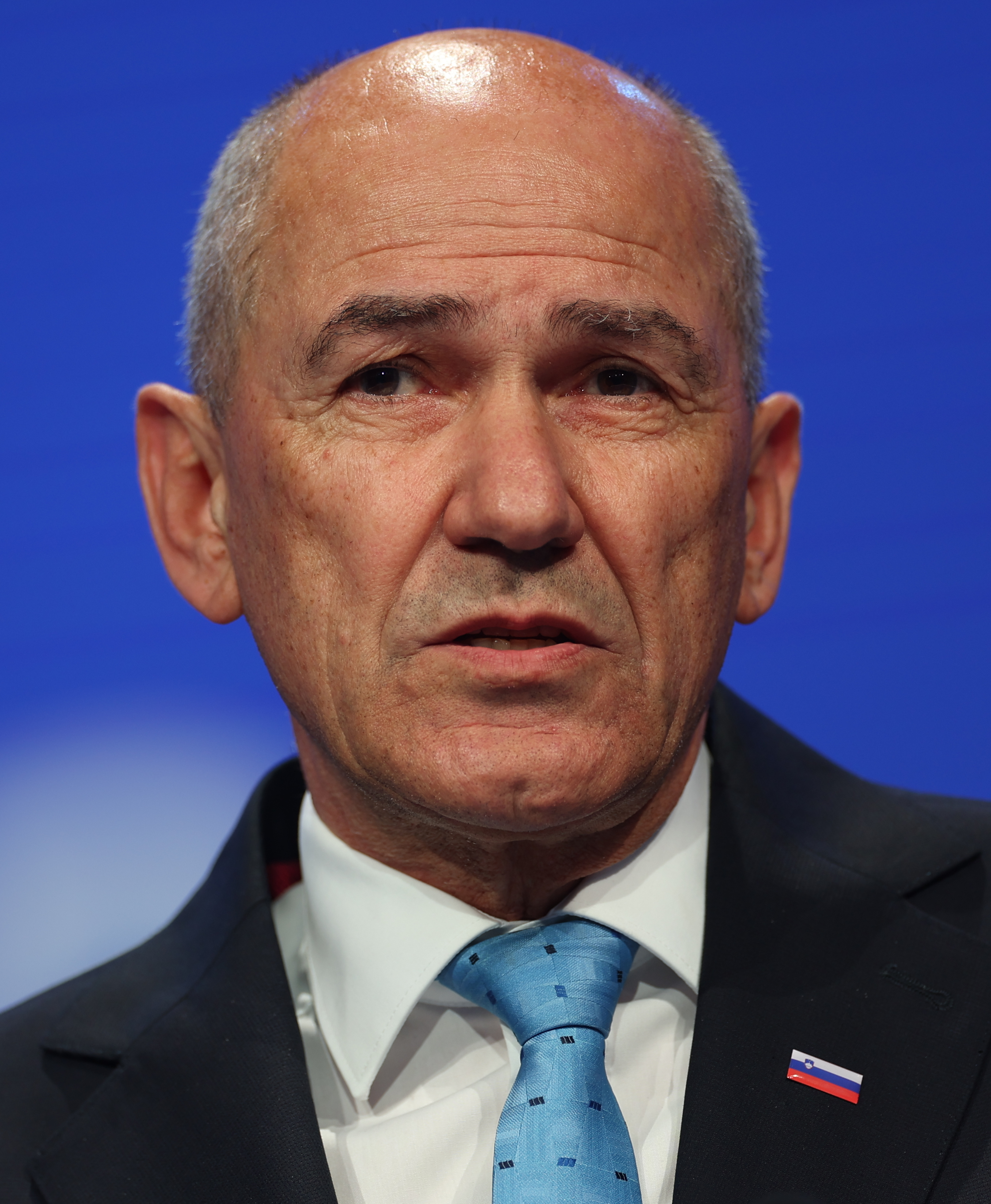
Janez Janša
Prime Minister

Slovenia is a parliamentary democracy republic with a multi-party system. According to the Global State of Democracy (GSoD) Indices and Democracy Tracker from the International Institude for Democracy and Election Assistance, Slovenia performs in the high range on overall democratic measures, with particular strengths in political representation, including elected government and inclusive suffrage.

=== President ===
The head of state is the president, who is elected by popular vote and has an important integrative role. The president is elected for five years and a maximum of two consecutive terms, and has a representative role. The president convenes and dissolves Parliament, may express opinions to the National Assembly on any matter of public importance, and has plenary power to call general elections, by-elections and snap elections. The president also nominates prominent state officials, including the prime minister and justices of the Constitutional Court, for the consideration of the National Assembly; conducts Slovenia's foreign relations in consultation with the Government; exercises supreme command and control over the Armed Forces as the commander-in-chief, including the use of significant war powers; confers state honours; and grants pardons, commutations, reprieves, and respites to individuals convicted of criminal offences.

=== Government ===
The executive and administrative authority in Slovenia is held by the Government of Slovenia (Vlada Republike Slovenije), led by the prime minister. The prime minister chairs the full Council of Ministers or cabinet, who are in turn elected by the National Assembly (Državni zbor Republike Slovenije). The Government is responsible for, among other things, executing the domestic and foreign policies of the state, directing and coordinating the activities of state agencies, preparing and administering the state budget, negotiating and concluding treaties, and implementing laws passed by the National Assembly and decrees issued by the president.

=== Parliament ===
==== Organisation ====
The legislative authority is held by the bicameral Parliament of Slovenia, characterised by an asymmetric duality between the National Assembly and the National Council. The bulk of power is concentrated in the National Assembly, which consists of ninety members. Of those, 88 are elected by all the citizens in a system of proportional representation, whereas two are elected by the registered members of the autochthonous Hungarian and Italian minorities. Elections take place every four years. The National Council (Državni svet Republike Slovenije), consisting of forty members appointed to represent social, economic, professional, and local interest groups, has a limited power of advisory and control.

==== Composition ====
The 1992–2004 period was marked by the rule of the Liberal Democracy of Slovenia, which was responsible for a gradual transition from the Titoist economy to the capitalist market economy. It later attracted much criticism by neo-liberal economists, who demanded a less gradual approach. The party's president Janez Drnovšek, who served as prime minister between 1992 and 2002, was one of the most influential Slovenian politicians of the 1990s, alongside President Milan Kučan (who served between 1990 and 2002).

The 2005–2008 period was characterized by over-enthusiasm after joining the EU. During the first term of Janez Janša's government, for the first time after independence, the Slovenian banks saw their loan-deposit ratios veering out of control. There was over-borrowing from foreign banks and then over-crediting of customers, including local business magnates. After the onset of the Great Recession and European sovereign-debt crisis, the left-wing coalition that replaced Janša's government in the 2008 elections had to face the consequences of the 2005–2008 over-borrowing. Attempts to implement reforms that would help economic recovery were met by student protesters, led by a student who later became a member of Janez Janša's Slovenian Democratic Party (SDS), and by the trade unions. The proposed reforms were postponed in a referendum. The left-wing government was ousted with a vote of no confidence.

In March 2020, Janez Janša became prime minister for a third time as the head of a coalition government of SDS, the Modern Centre Party (SMC), New Slovenia (NSi) and Pensioners' Party (DeSUS). Janez Janša was described as a right-wing populist and a supporter of US President Donald Trump.

In April 2022, the Freedom Movement, part of the liberal opposition, won the 2022 Slovenian parliamentary election. The Freedom Movement received 34.5% votes, while Janša's SDS received 23.6%.

On 25 May 2022, Slovenia's parliament voted to appoint the leader of Freedom Movement, Robert Golob, as the new Prime Minister of Slovenia.

On 22 May 2026, the Slovenian National Assembly appointed Janez Janša prime minister for a fourth time. Janša was backed by 51 of 87 of the Assembly's deputies after he had formed a coalition with other centre-right parties.

=== Judiciary ===
Slovenia's constitutional, supreme, inferior, and trial courts, whose judges are appointed on the basis of merit for terms of good behaviour, are responsible for the administration of justice. Judicial power in Slovenia is exercised by these courts of competent jurisdiction, alongside specialised courts that deal with matters relating to specific legal areas. The Constitutional Court, composed of nine justices nominated by the president and confirmed by the National Assembly for nine-year terms, decides on the conformity of laws and regulations with the Constitution. Its power of constitutional review extends to assuring laws and regulations conform with the general principles of international law and with ratified international agreements. All other judges are appointed by the Judicial Council, an independent public body responsible for the court administration, including the recruitment of judges qualified by merit and their discipline. Five out of the 11 council members are nominated by the president, with the remainder elected by and from amongst sitting judges. Presidential nominees must be university professors of law, senior counsel, or attorneys accepted to the State Bar.

The Supreme State Prosecutor's Office, led by the state prosecutor general, is an independent state authority responsible for prosecuting those suspected of committing criminal offences against the Slovenian state. The state prosecutor general is nominated by the Government and confirmed by the National Assembly for a six-year term. Together with all state prosecutors employed by the Supreme State Prosecutor's Office and the eleven district state prosecutor's offices, the state prosecutor general is subject to the professional oversight of the State Prosecutorial Council, a regulatory body.

=== Military ===
The Slovenian Armed Forces provide military defence independently or within an alliance, in accordance with international agreements. Since conscription was abolished in 2003, it is organized as a fully professional standing army. The Commander-in-chief is the President of the Republic of Slovenia, while operational command is in the domain of the Chief of the General Staff of the Slovenian Armed Forces. In 2016, military spending was an estimated 0.91% of the country's GDP. Since joining NATO, the Slovenian Armed Forces have taken a more active part in supporting international peace. They have participated in peace support operations and humanitarian activities: among others, Slovenian soldiers are part of the international forces serving in Bosnia and Herzegovina, Kosovo, and Afghanistan. According to the 2024 Global Peace Index, Slovenia is the 9th most peaceful country in the world.

=== Administrative divisions and traditional regions ===
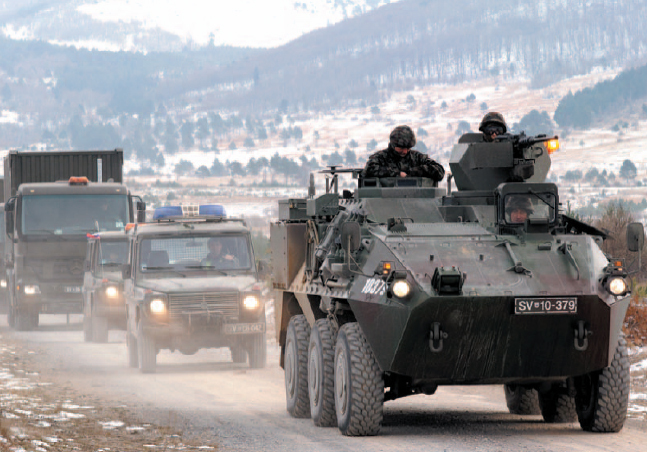
(SAF), Slovenian KFOR contingent in Kosovo.

==== Municipalities ====
Slovenia is subdivided into 212 municipalities (twelve of which have the status of urban municipalities). The municipalities are the only bodies of local autonomy in Slovenia. Each municipality is headed by a mayor (župan), elected every four years by popular vote, and a municipal council (občinski svet). In the majority of municipalities, the municipal council is elected through the system of proportional representation; only a few smaller municipalities use the plurality voting system. In the urban municipalities, the municipal councils are called town (or city) councils. Every municipality also has a Head of the Municipal Administration (načelnik občinske uprave) appointed by the mayor, who is responsible for the functioning of the local administration.

==== Administrative units (upravne enote) ====
There is no official intermediate unit between the municipalities and the Republic of Slovenia. The 58 "Administrative units" (upravne enote) are only subdivisions of the national government administration and are named after their respective bases of government offices. For EU statistical purposes, these 58 administrative units were classified "local administrative unit 1" (LAU 1). They are the continuation of the 62 municipalities before 1994 (until then, Ljubljana was split in five municipalities: Bežigrad, Center, Moste-Polje, Šiška and Vič-Rudnik). The 88 electoral districts of Slovenia are still named after these 62 old municipalities.

==== Traditional regions and identities ====
Slovenia's traditional regions are based on the former Habsburg crown lands, which included Carniola, Carinthia, Styria, and the Littoral. Rather than identifying with Carniola as a whole or with Slovenia as a state, Slovenes tend to identify themselves more strongly with the traditional regions of the Slovene Littoral, Prekmurje, and traditional (sub)regions, such as Upper Carniola, Lower Carniola, and, to a lesser extent, Inner Carniola.

The capital city of Ljubljana was historically the administrative seat of Carniola and belonged to Inner Carniola, except for the Šentvid district, which was in Upper Carniola, and also where the border between German-annexed territory and the Italian Province of Ljubljana was during World War II.

==== Statistical regions ====
Statistical regions: 1. Gorizia, 2. Upper Carniola, 3. Carinthia, 4. Drava, 5. Mura, 6. Central Slovenia, 7. Central Sava, 8. Savinja, 9. Coastal–Karst, 10. Inner Carniola–Karst, 11. Southeast Slovenia, 12. Lower Sava.

The 12 statistical regions have no administrative function and are subdivided into two macroregions for the purpose of the Regional policy of the European Union. These two macroregions are:

- Eastern Slovenia (Vzhodna Slovenija – SI01), which groups the Mura, Drava, Carinthia, Savinja, Central Sava, Lower Sava, Southeast Slovenia, and Inner Carniola–Karst statistical regions.
- Western Slovenia (Zahodna Slovenija – SI02), which groups the Central Slovenia, Upper Carniola, Gorizia, and Coastal–Karst statistical regions.

== Economy ==
Slovenia has a developed economy and is the richest Slavic country by GDP per capita. Slovenia is also among the top global economies in terms of human capital. It is the most developed transition country with an old mining-industrial tradition, chemical industry, and a developed service sector. In the beginning of 2007, Slovenia was the first new member state to introduce the euro as its currency, replacing the tolar. Since 2010, it has been member of the Organisation for Economic Co-operation and Development. There is a significant difference in prosperity between the various regions of Slovenia. The economically wealthiest regions are the Central Slovenia region, which includes the capital Ljubljana and the western Slovenian regions (the Gorizia and Coastal–Karst Statistical Regions), while the least wealthy regions are the Mura, Central Sava, and Littoral–Inner Carniola Statistical Regions.

=== Economic growth ===
GDP per capita development in Slovenia.

In 2004–06, the economy grew on average by nearly 5% per year in Slovenia; in 2007, it expanded by almost 7%. The growth surge was fuelled by debt, particularly among firms, and especially in construction. The Great Recession and European sovereign-debt crisis had a significant impact on the domestic economy. The construction industry was severely hit in 2010 and 2011.

In 2009, Slovenian GDP per capita shrank by 8%, the biggest decline in the EU after the Baltic countries and Finland. Its rapidly aging population has been an increasing burden for the Slovenian economy.

In August 2012, the year-on-year contraction was 0.8%; however, 0.2% growth was recorded in the first quarter (in relation to the quarter before, after data was adjusted according to season and working days). Year-on-year contraction has been attributed to the fall in domestic consumption and the slowdown in export growth. The decrease in domestic consumption has been attributed to the fiscal austerity, the freeze on budget expenditure in the final months of 2011, the failure of the efforts to implement economic reforms, inappropriate financing, and the decrease in exports.

Due to the effects of the crisis, it was expected that several banks had to be bailed out by EU funds in 2013; however, needed capital was able to be covered by the country's own funds. Fiscal actions and legislations aimed toward the reduction of spendings, as well as several privatisations, supported an economic recovery from 2014. The real economic growth rate was at 2.5% in 2016 and accelerated to 5% in 2017. The construction sector has seen a recent increase, and the tourism industry is expected to have continuous rising numbers.

Since 2017, Slovenia has experienced moderate economic growth, with GDP growth averaging around 2% per year between 2017 and 2019. However, like many other countries, Slovenia's economy has been impacted by the COVID-19 pandemic, with a contraction of around 5% in 2020. Overall, Slovenia's economy is relatively small but open and has shown resilience in recent years.

Slovenia's manufacturing sector is one of the largest contributors to the country's economy, accounting for around 25% of GDP. The country has a strong tradition in manufacturing, particularly in the areas of automotive and electrical engineering. Other important sectors include services, which account for around 65% of GDP, and agriculture, forestry, and fishing, which account for around 2% of GDP.

Slovenia is a highly export-oriented economy, with exports accounting for around 80% of GDP. The country's main export partners are other European countries, particularly Germany, Italy, and Austria. Key exports include machinery and transport equipment, manufactured goods, and chemicals.

The government of Slovenia has implemented a range of policies aimed at promoting economic growth and development. These include efforts to attract foreign investment, reduce red tape, and increase investment in research and development. Slovenia was ranked 35th in the Global Innovation Index in 2025. The country has also introduced reforms aimed at improving the efficiency of its labour market and increasing the flexibility of its economy. The government's approach to consulting business associations has been noted by the European Commission as a good practice example.

=== Services and industry ===
Almost two-thirds of people are employed in services, and over one-third in industry and construction. Slovenia benefits from a well-educated workforce, well-developed infrastructure, and its location at the crossroads of major trade routes.

The level of foreign direct investment (FDI) per capita in Slovenia is one of the lowest in the EU. The labour productivity and competitiveness of the Slovenian economy is still significantly below the EU average. Taxes are relatively high, the labour market is seen by business interests as being inflexible, and industries are losing sales to China, India, and elsewhere.

High level of openness makes Slovenia extremely sensitive to economic conditions in its main trading partners and changes in its international price competitiveness. The main industries are motor vehicles, electric and electronic equipment, machinery, pharmaceuticals, and fuels. Examples of major Slovenian companies operating in Slovenia include the home appliance manufacturer Gorenje, the pharmaceutical companies Krka and Lek (Novartis' subsidiary), the oil distributing company Petrol Group, energy distribution companys GEN, GEN-I, HSE, and Revoz, a manufacturing subsidiary of Renault.

=== Energy ===
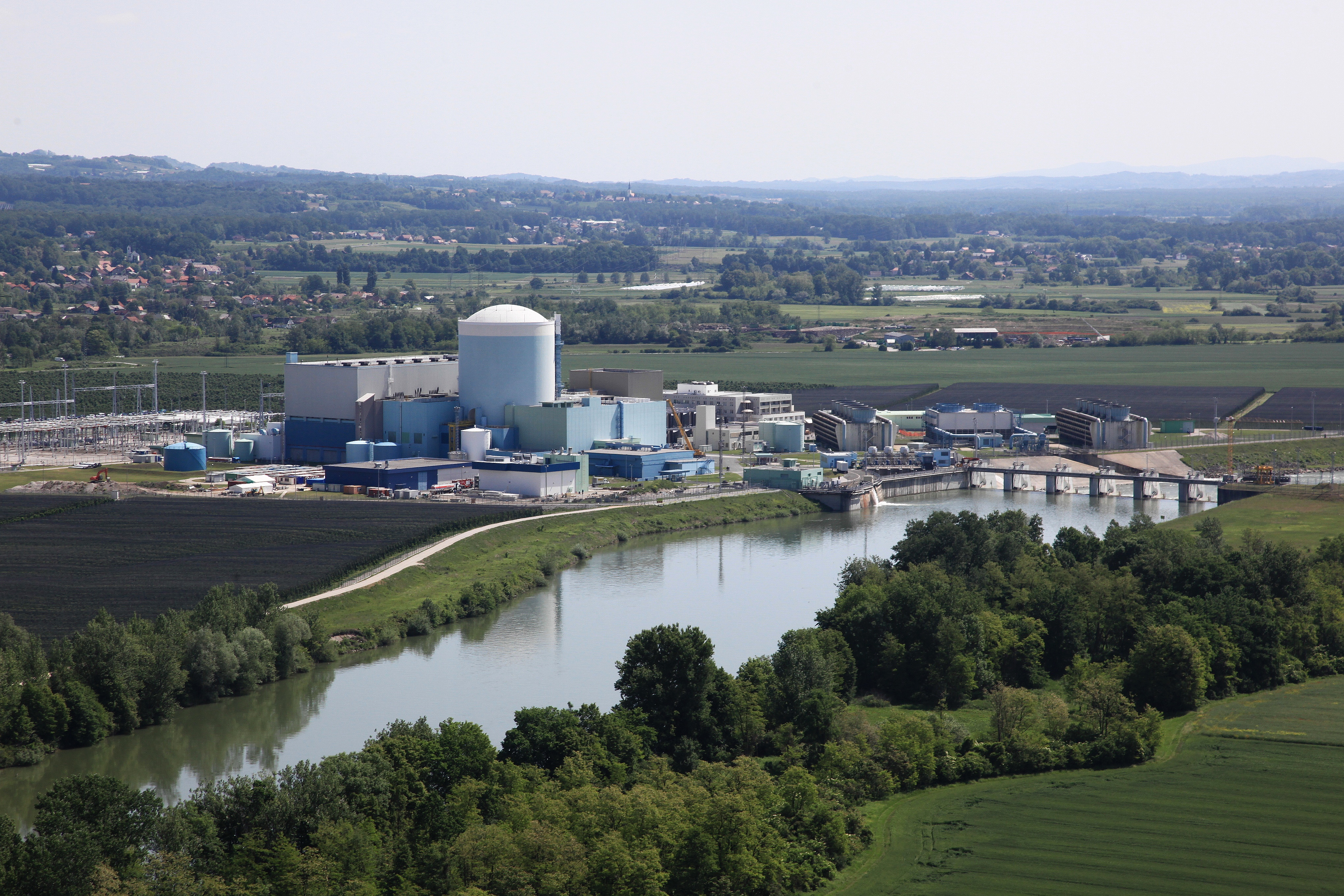
Krško Nuclear Power Plant, 696 MW.

In 2018, the net energy production was 12,262 GWh and consumption was 14,501 GWh. Hydroelectric plants produced 4,421 GWh, thermal plants produced 4,049 GWh, and the Krško Nuclear Power Plant produced 2,742 GWh (a 50% share goes to Slovenia; the other 50% go to Croatia due to joint ownership). Domestic electricity consumption was covered 84.6% by domestic production; the percentage has been decreasing from year to year, meaning Slovenia is more and more dependent on electricity imports.

A new 600 MW block of Šoštanj thermal power plant finished construction and went online in the autumn of 2014. The new 39.5 MW HE Krško hydro power plant was finished in 2013. The 41.5 MW HE Brežice and 30.5 MW HE Mokrice hydro power plants were built on the Sava River in 2018, and the construction of ten more hydropower plants with a cumulative capacity of 338 MW is planned to be finished by 2030. A large pumped-storage hydro power plant Kozjak on the Drava River is in the planning stage.

At the end of 2018, at least 295 MWp of photovoltaic modules and 31,4 MW of biogas power plants were installed. Compared to 2017, renewable energy sources contributed 5.6 percentage points more into whole energy consumption. There is interest to add more production in the area of solar and wind energy sources (subsidising schemes are increasing economic feasibility), but microlocation settlement procedures take an enormous toll on the efficiency of this initiative (the dilemma of nature preservation vs. energy production facilities).

=== Tourism ===
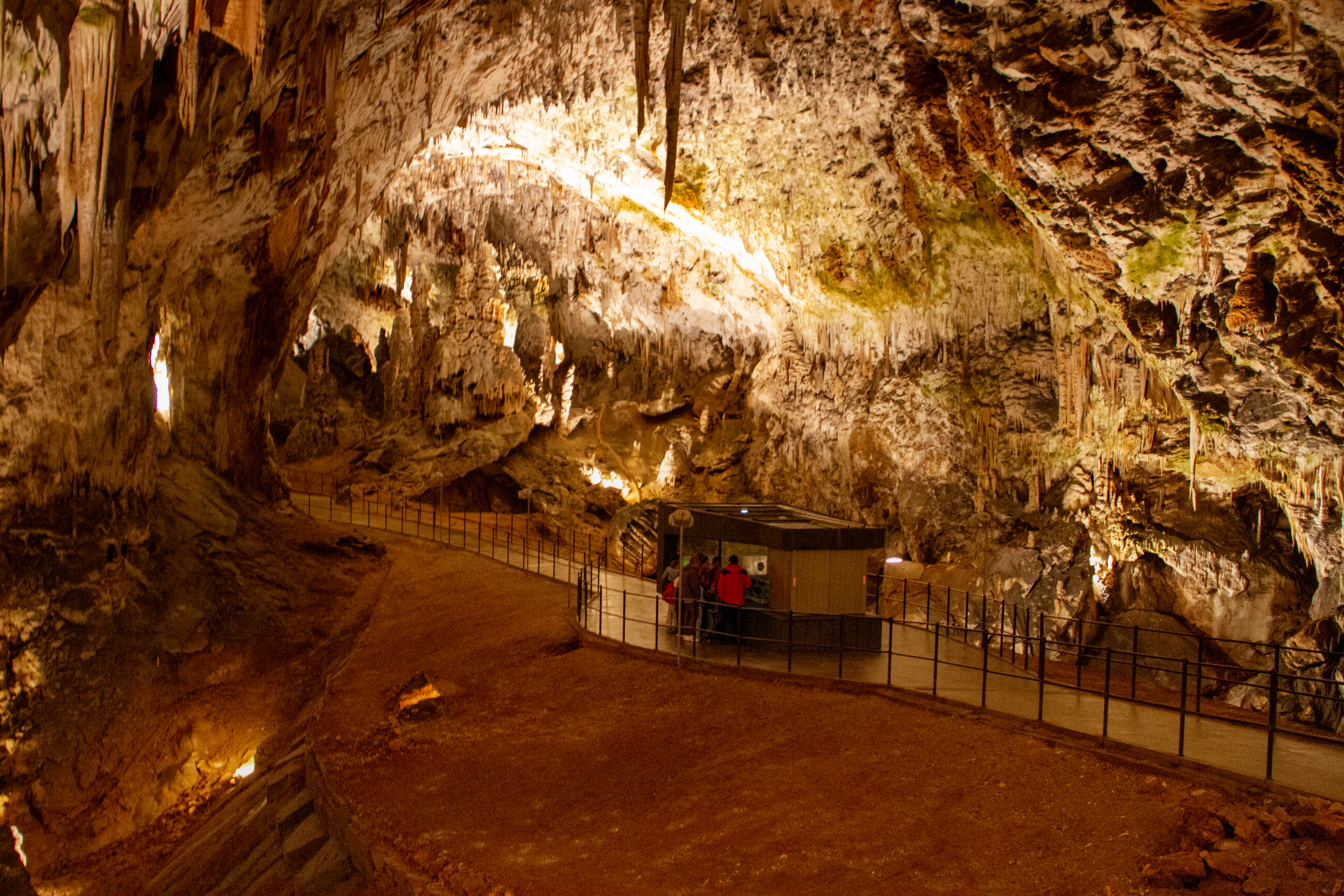
Postojna Cave

Slovenia offers tourists a wide variety of natural and cultural amenities. Different forms of tourism have developed. Tourists are attracted to a wide range of locations, however, the tourist market is small. There has been no large-scale tourism and no acute environmental pressures; in 2017, National Geographic Traveller's Magazine declared Slovenia as the country with the world's most sustainable tourism. The nation's capital, Ljubljana, has many important Baroque and Vienna Secession buildings, with several important works of the native born architect Jože Plečnik.

At the northwestern corner of the country lie the Julian Alps with Lake Bled and the Soča Valley, as well as the nation's highest peak, Mount Triglav, in the middle of Triglav National Park. Other mountain ranges include Kamnik–Savinja Alps, the Karawanks, and Pohorje, popular with skiers and hikers.

The Karst Plateau in the Slovene Littoral gave its name to karst, a landscape shaped by water dissolving the carbonate bedrock, forming caves. The best-known caves are Postojna Cave and the UNESCO-listed Škocjan Caves. The region of Slovenian Istria meets the Adriatic Sea, where the most important historical monument is the Venetian Gothic Mediterranean town of Piran, while the settlement of Portorož attracts crowds in summer.

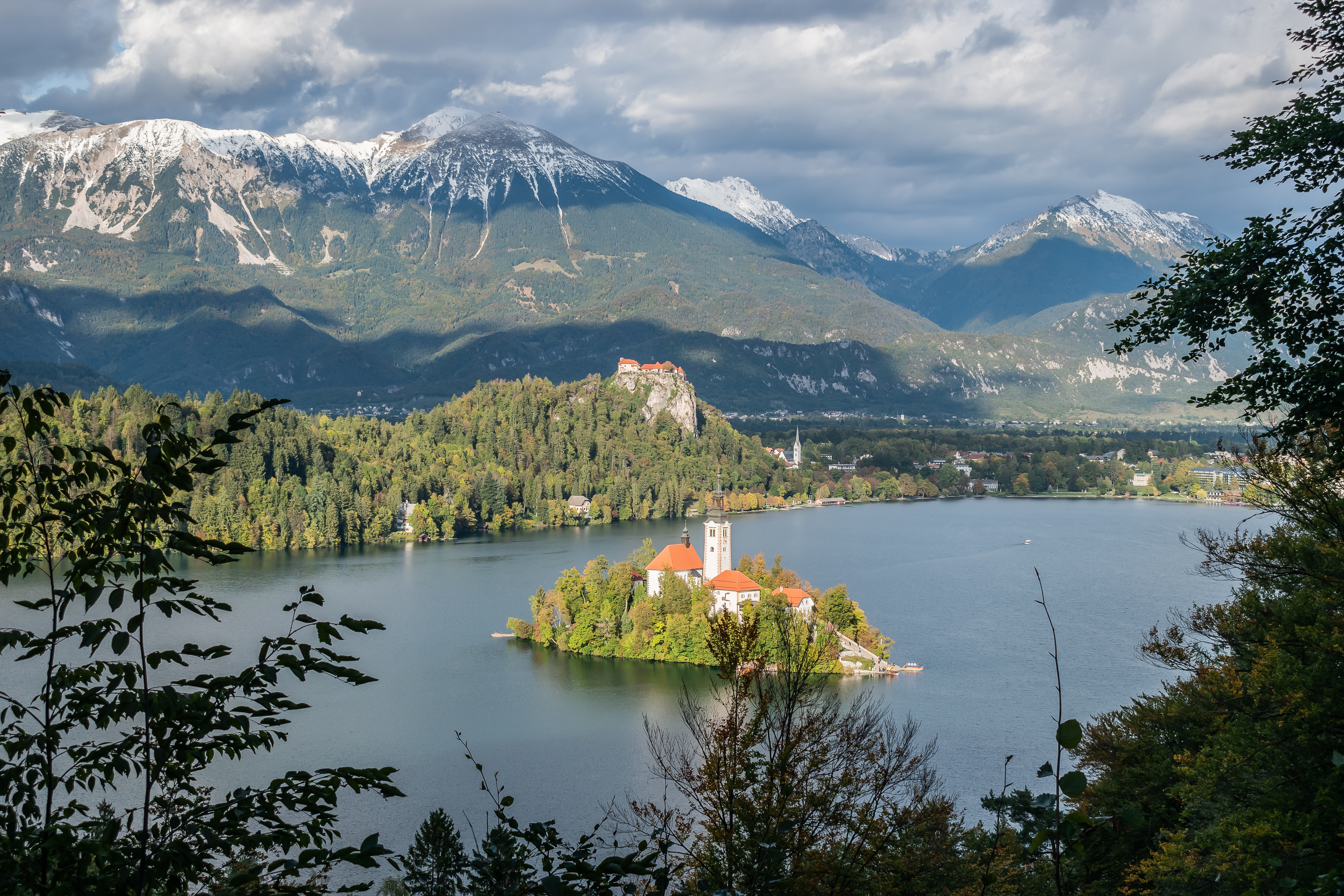
Lake Bled with its island.

The hills around Slovenia's second-largest city, Maribor, are renowned for their wine-making. The northeastern part of the country is rich with spas, with Rogaška Slatina, Radenci, Čatež ob Savi, Dobrna, and Moravske Toplice growing in importance in the last two decades.

Other popular tourist destinations include the historic cities of Ptuj and Škofja Loka, and several castles, such as Predjama Castle.

Important parts of tourism in Slovenia include congress and gambling tourism. Slovenia is the country with the highest percentage of casinos per 1,000 inhabitants in the EU. Perla Casinò & Hotel in Nova Gorica is the largest casino in the region.

Most of the foreign tourists to Slovenia come from the key European markets: Italy, Austria, Germany, Croatia, Belgium, Netherlands, Serbia, Russia and Ukraine, followed by the United Kingdom and Ireland. European tourists create more than 90% of Slovenia's tourist income. In 2016, Slovenia was declared the world's first green country by the Netherlands-based organization Green Destinations. After being declared the most sustainable country in 2016, Slovenia had an important role at the ITB Berlin to promote sustainable tourism.

=== Transport ===
Geography has dictated transport routes in Slovenia. Significant mountain ranges, major rivers, and proximity to the Danube played roles in the development of the area's transportation corridors. One recent advantage is the Pan-European transport corridors, particularly Corridor V (the fastest link between the North Adriatic, and Central and Eastern Europe) and Corridor X (linking Central Europe with the Balkans). This gives it a special position in the European social, economic, and cultural integration and restructuring.

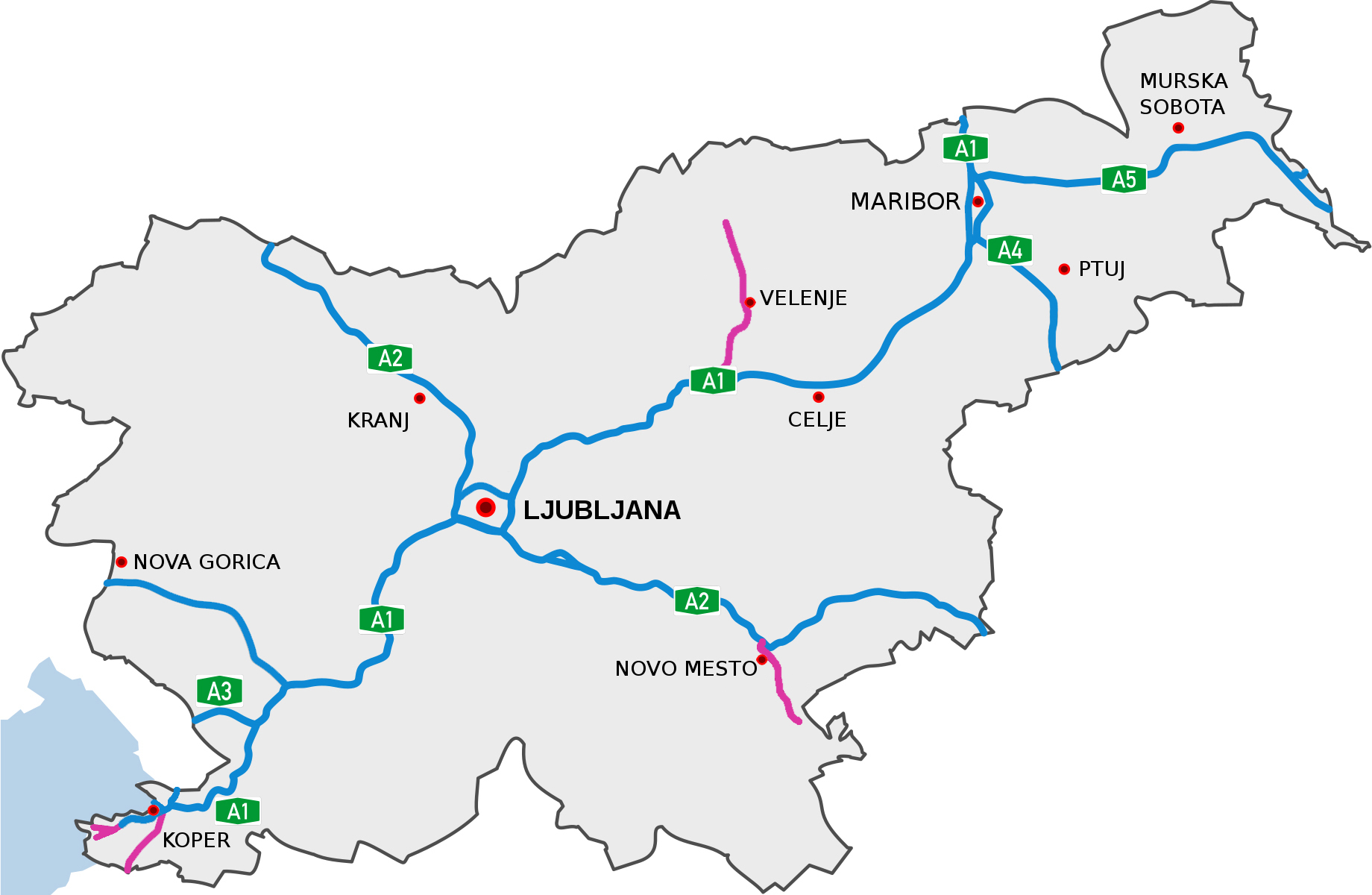
Motorways in Slovenia in August 2020.

==== Roads ====
Road freight and passenger transport constitutes the largest part of transport in Slovenia at 80%. Personal cars are much more popular than public road passenger transport, which has significantly declined. Slovenia has a very high highway and motorway density compared to the EU average. The highway system, the construction of which was accelerated after 1994, has slowly but steadily transformed Slovenia into a large conurbation. Other state roads have been rapidly deteriorating because of neglect and the overall increase in traffic.

==== Railways ====
The existing Slovenian railways are out-of-date and have difficulty competing with the motorway network; partially as a result of dispersed population settlement. Due to this fact, and the projected increase in traffic through the port in Koper, which is primarily by train, a second rail on the Koper-Divača route is in early stages of construction. With a lack of financial assets, maintenance, and modernisation, the Slovenian railway network has been neglected; due to the out-of-date infrastructure, the share of railway freight transport has been in decline in Slovenia. The railway passenger transport has been recovering after a large drop in the 1990s. The Pan-European railway corridors V and X, and several other major European rail lines intersect in Slovenia.

==== Ports ====
The major Slovenian port is the Port of Koper. It is the largest Northern Adriatic port in terms of container transport, with almost 590,000 TEUs annually and lines to all major world ports. It is much closer to destinations east of the Suez Canal than the ports of Northern Europe. In addition, maritime passenger traffic mostly takes place in Koper. Two smaller ports used for international passenger transport as well as cargo transport are located in Izola and Piran. Passenger transport mainly takes place with Italy and Croatia. Splošna plovba, the only Slovenian shipping company, transports freight and is active only in foreign ports.

==== Air ====
Air transport in Slovenia is very low, but has significantly grown since 1991. Of the three international airports in Slovenia, Ljubljana Jože Pučnik Airport in central Slovenia is the busiest, with connections to many major European destinations. The Maribor Edvard Rusjan Airport is located in the eastern part of the country, and the Portorož Airport in the west. The state-owned Adria Airways was the largest Slovenian airline; however, it declared bankruptcy in 2019 and ceased operations. Since 2003, several new carriers have entered the market, especially low-cost airlines. The only Slovenian military airport is the Cerklje ob Krki Air Base in the southwest. There are also 12 public airports in Slovenia.

== Demographics ==
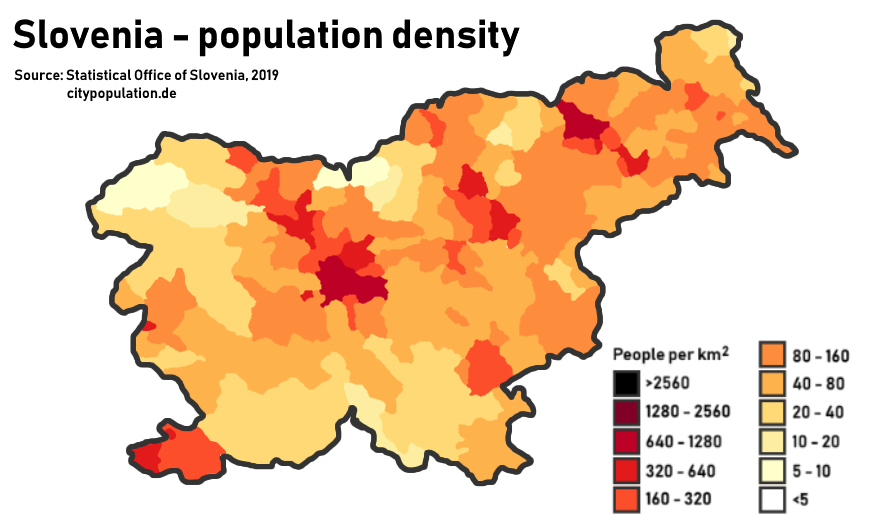
Population density in Slovenia by municipality. The four main urban areas are visible: Ljubljana and Kranj (centre), Maribor (northeast) and the Slovene Istria (southwest).

The population of Slovenia as of July 2026 is 2,138,751. Slovenia ranks low among the European countries in population density, with 105.5 inhabitants per square kilometre (272/sq mi) — compared to 402/km^{2} (1,040/mi^{2}) for the Netherlands or 195/km^{2} (510/mi^{2}) for Italy). The Inner Carniola–Karst Statistical Region has the lowest population density, while the Central Slovenia Statistical Region has the highest.

Slovenia is among the European countries with the most pronounced ageing of its population, ascribable to a low birth rate and increasing life expectancy. The total fertility rate (TFR) in 2024 was estimated at 1.6 children born per woman, which is lower than the replacement rate of 2.1. The majority of children are born to unmarried women (in 2023, 56.5% of all births were outside of marriage). In 2023, the average life expectancy at birth was 82 years: 79.1 years for males and 85 years for females, marking a significant difference in life expectancy between genders. Almost all Slovenian inhabitants older than 64 are retired, with no significant difference between genders. The working-age group is diminishing in spite of immigration; nevertheless, a proposal to raise the retirement age from the current 57 for women and 58 for men was rejected in a referendum in 2011.

In 2024, the suicide rate in Slovenia was 15.4 per 100,000 people per year, which is only slightly higher than in Finland (13.4). From 2000 to 2010, the suicide rate decreased by about 30%, but the differences between regions and genders are still pronounced.

=== Ethnic structure ===
The largest ethnic groups in Slovenia are Slovenes (83.1%), Serbs (2.0%), Croats (1.8%), Bosniaks (1.6%), Muslims (0.5%), Bosnians (0.4%), Hungarians (0.3%), Albanians (0.3%), and Roma (0.2%). Other ethnic groups in Slovenia include Macedonians, Italians, Montenegrins, and Germans.

=== Urbanisation ===
Depending on definition, between 65% and 79% of people live in wider urban areas. According to the OECD definition of rural and urban areas, none of the Slovene statistical regions are urban, meaning that over 15% of the population in each region lives in rural communities. According to this classification standard, the Slovene statistical regions are categorized as follows:

- Moderately rural regions (15-50% of the population lives in rural municipalities): Central Sava, Upper Carniola, Coastal–Karst, Central Slovenia.
- Mostly rural regions (more than 50% of the population lives in rural municipalities): Mura, Drava, Carinthia, Savinja, Lower Sava, Littoral–Inner Carniola, Gorizia, Southeast Slovenia.

The only large town is the capital, Ljubljana. Other (medium-sized) towns include Maribor, Celje, and Kranj. Overall, there are eleven urban municipalities in Slovenia.

Largest cities or towns in Slovenia Statistical Office: Largest settlements by population (1 January 2024)
Rank	Name	Statistical region	Pop.
1	Ljubljana	Central Slovenia	288,382
2	Maribor	Drava	97,068
3	Kranj	Upper Carniola	37,802
4	Celje	Savinja	37,727
5	Koper	Coastal–Karst	26,305
6	Velenje	Savinja	25,473
7	Novo Mesto	Southeast Slovenia	24,446
8	Ptuj	Drava	18,274
9	Kamnik	Central Slovenia	13,807
10	Jesenice	Upper Carniola	13,778

=== Languages ===
The official language in Slovenia is Slovene, which is a member of the South Slavic language group. In 2002, Slovene was the native language of around 88% of Slovenia's population according to the census, with more than 92% of the Slovenian population speaking it in their home environment. This statistic ranks Slovenia among the most homogeneous countries in the EU in terms of the share of speakers of the predominant mother tongue.

Slovene is a highly diverse Slavic language in terms of dialects, with different degrees of mutual intelligibility. Accounts of the number of dialects range from as few as seven dialects, often considered dialect groups or dialect bases, which are then subdivided into as many as 50 dialects. Other sources characterize the number of dialects as nine or eight.

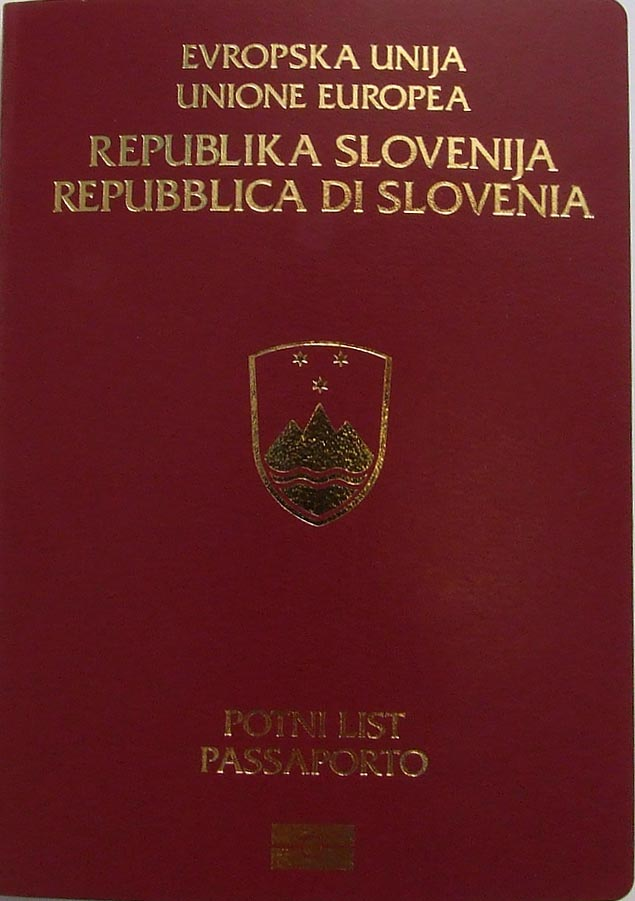
Front cover of a bilingual passport in Slovene and Italian.

Hungarian and Italian, spoken by the respective ethnic minority groups, have the status of official languages in the ethnically mixed regions along the Hungarian and Italian borders, to the extent that even the passports issued in those areas are bilingual. In 2002, around 0.2% of the Slovenian population spoke Italian and around 0.4% spoke Hungarian as their native language. Hungarian is co-official with Slovene in 30 settlements in 5 municipalities (whereof 3 are officially bilingual). Italian is co-official with Slovene in 25 settlements in 4 municipalities (all of them officially bilingual).

Romani, spoken as the native language by 0.2% of people in 2002, is a legally protected language in Slovenia. Romani speakers mainly belong to the geographically dispersed and marginalized community of Romani people.

German, which used to be the largest minority language in Slovenia prior to World War II (around 4% of the population in 1921), is now the native language of only around 0.08% of the population, the majority of whom are over 60 years old. Gottscheerish or Granish, the traditional German dialect of Gottschee County, faces extinction.

A significant number of people in Slovenia speak a variant of Serbo-Croatian (Serbian, Croatian, Bosnian, or Montenegrin) as their native language. These are mostly families who moved to Slovenia from other former Yugoslav republics. Altogether, Serbo-Croatian in its different forms is the second natively spoken language in Slovenia with 5.9% of population. In 2002, 0.4% of the Slovenian population declared themselves to be native speakers of Albanian and 0.2% native speakers of Macedonian. Czech, the fourth-largest minority language in Slovenia prior to World War II (after German, Hungarian, and Serbo-Croatian), is now the native language of a few hundred residents of Slovenia.

Slovenia ranks among the top European countries in knowledge of foreign languages. The most taught foreign languages are English, German, Italian, French, and Spanish. As of 2007, 92% of the population between the age of 25 and 64 spoke at least one foreign language and around 71.8% of them spoke at least two foreign languages, which was the highest percentage in the EU. According to the Eurobarometer survey, as of 2005 the majority of Slovenes could speak Croatian (61%) and English (56%). A reported 42% of Slovenes could speak German, which was one of the highest percentages outside German-speaking countries. Italian is widely spoken on the Slovenian Coast and in some other areas of the Slovene Littoral. Around 15% of Slovenians can speak Italian, which (according to the Eurobarometer pool) is the third-highest percentage in the EU, after Italy and Malta.

=== Immigration ===
In 2021, about 13.9% (292,824 people) of the population in Slovenia was born abroad. About 86% of the foreign-born population originated from other countries of former Yugoslavia, such as (in descending order) Bosnia-Herzegovina, followed by immigrants from Croatia, Serbia, Kosovo, and North Macedonia.

By the beginning of 2017, there were about 114,438 people with foreign citizenship residing in the country, making up 5.5% of the total population. Of these foreigners, 76% had citizenships of the other countries from former Yugoslavia (excluding Croatia). Additionally, 16.4% had EU-citizenships and 7.6% had citizenships of other countries.

Ethnic composition of Slovenia (according to the 2002 census)
Slovene	83.06%
Serb	1.98%
Croat	1.81%
Bosniak	1.10%
Other minorities	4.85%
Undeclared or unknown	8.9%

According to the 2002 census, Slovenia's main ethnic group are Slovenes (83%); however, their share in the total population is continuously decreasing, due to the relatively low fertility rate. At least 13% (2002) of the population were immigrants from other parts of former Yugoslavia and their descendants. They have settled mainly in cities and suburbanised areas. Relatively small but protected by the Constitution of Slovenia are the Hungarian and the Italian ethnic minorities. A special position is held by the autochthonous and geographically dispersed Roma ethnic community.

The number of people immigrating into Slovenia rose steadily from 1995 and has been increasing even more rapidly in recent years. After Slovenia joined the EU in 2004, the annual number of immigrants doubled by 2006 and increased by half again by 2009. In 2007, Slovenia had one of the fastest growing net migration rates in the EU.

=== Religion ===
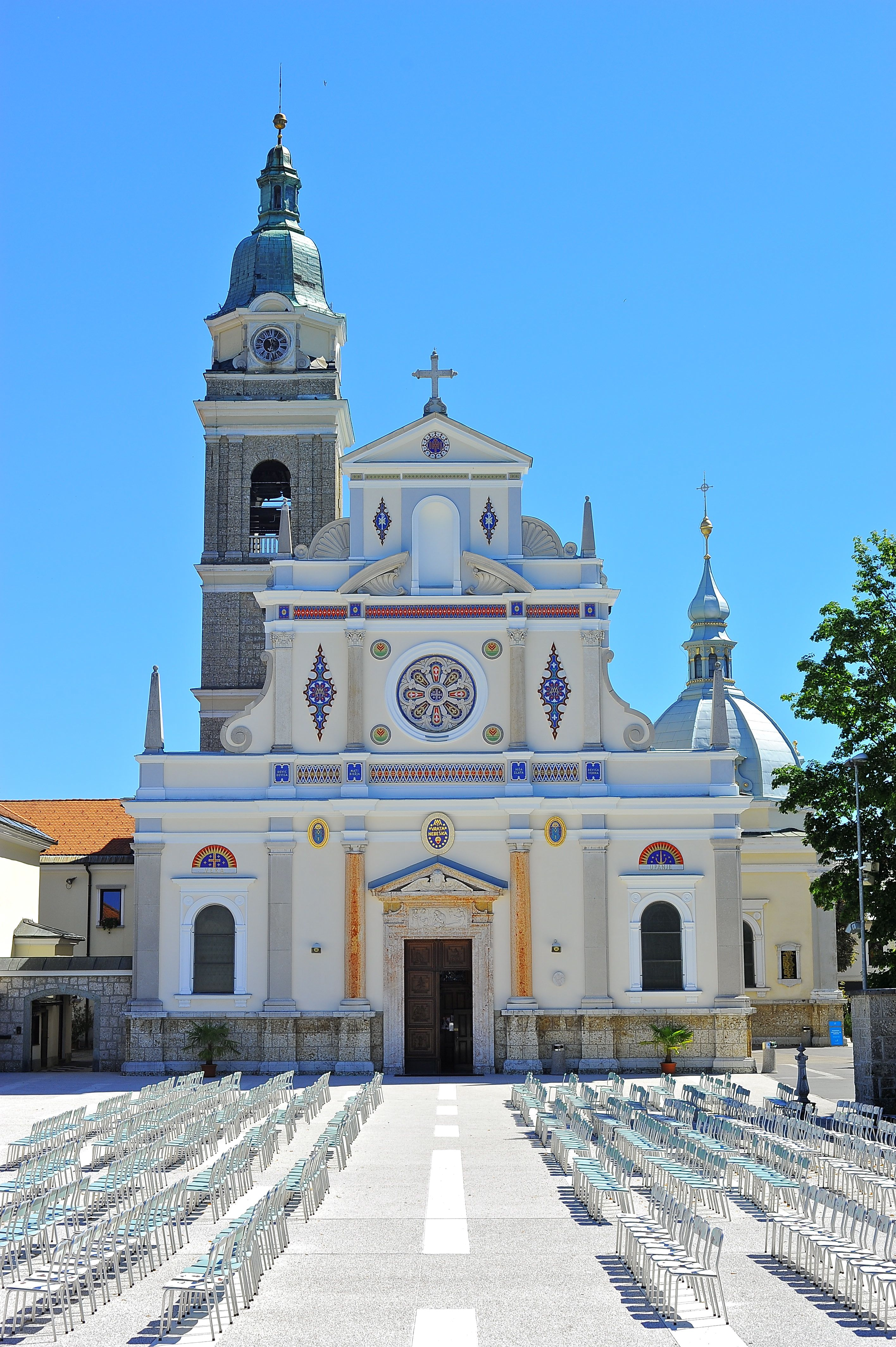
The National Shrine Mary Help of Christians at Brezje.

Before World War II, 97% of the Slovenian population identified as members of the Catholic Church in Slovenia, around 2.5% as Lutheran, and around 0.5% as members of other denominations. After 1945, the country underwent a process of gradual but steady secularization. After a decade of persecution of religions, the Communist regime adopted a policy of relative tolerance towards churches. After 1990, the Catholic Church regained some of its former influence, but Slovenia remains a largely secular society.

The 2018 Eurobarometer survey data shows 73.4% of population identifying as Catholic, which fell to 72.1% in the 2019 survey. According to the Catholic Church data, the Catholic population fell from 78.04% in 2009 to 72.11% in 2019. The vast majority of Slovenian Catholics belong to the Latin Church. A small number of Eastern Catholics live in the White Carniola region.

Religion in Slovenia (2019)
1. Catholic 72.1 (69.5%)
2. None 18 (17.4%)
3. Orthodox 3.7 (3.57%)
4. Protestant 0.9 (0.87%)
5. Other Christian 1 (0.96%)
6. Muslim 3 (2.89%)
7. Other religion 3 (2.89%)
8. Undeclared 2 (1.93%)

Despite a relatively small number of Protestants (less than 1% in 2002), the Protestant legacy is historically significant given that the Slovene standard language and Slovene literature were established by the Protestant Reformation. Primož Trubar, a theologian in the Lutheran tradition, was one of the most influential Protestant Reformers in Slovenia. Protestantism was extinguished in the Counter-Reformation implemented by the Habsburg dynasty, which controlled the region. It only survived in the easternmost regions due to protection of Hungarian nobles, who often happened to be Calvinist themselves. Today, a significant Lutheran minority lives in the easternmost region of Prekmurje, where they represent around a fifth of the population and are headed by a bishop with the seat in Murska Sobota.

The third largest denomination, with around 2.2% of the population, is the Eastern Orthodox Church, with most adherents belonging to the Serbian Orthodox Church and a minority belonging to the Macedonian and other Eastern Orthodox churches.

According to the 2002 census, Islam is the second-largest religion in the country, with around 2.4% of the population. Most Slovenian Muslims came from Bosnia.

There was a Slovenian Jewish community before the Holocaust.

In 2002, around 10% of Slovenes declared themselves atheists, another 10% professed no specific denomination, and around 16% declined to answer. According to the Eurobarometer poll in 2010, 32% of Slovenian citizens "believe there is a god", whereas 36% "believe there is some sort of spirit or life force", and 26% "do not believe there is any sort of spirit, god, or life force".

=== Education ===
Slovenia's education ranks as the 12th best in the world and 4th best in the EU, being significantly higher than the OECD average, according to the Programme for International Student Assessment. Among people age 25 to 64, 12% have attended higher education, while Slovenes have 9.6 years of formal education on average. According to an OECD report, 83% of adults ages 25–64 have earned the equivalent of a high school degree, well above the OECD average of 74%; among 25- to 34-year-olds, the rate is 93%. According to the 1991 census, Slovenia has a 99.6% literacy level. Lifelong learning is also increasing.

Responsibility for education oversight at primary and secondary level in Slovenia lies with the Ministry of Education and Sports. After non-compulsory pre-school education, children enter the nine-year primary school at the age of six. Primary school is divided into three periods, each of three years. In the 2006–2007 academic year, there were 166,000 pupils enrolled in elementary education and more than 13,225 teachers, giving a ratio of one teacher per 12 pupils and 20 pupils per class.

After completing elementary school, nearly all children (more than 98%) go on to secondary education, either vocational, technical, or general secondary programmes (gimnazija). The last concludes with the matura, a comprehensive exam that allows the graduates to enter a university. 84% of secondary school graduates go on to pursue tertiary education.

The best ranked university in Slovenia is the University of Ljubljana, ranking among the first 500, or the top 3% of the world's universities according to the Academic Ranking of World Universities. Two other public universities include the University of Maribor in the Styria region and the University of Primorska in Slovene Littoral. In addition, there is a private University of Nova Gorica and an international EMUNI University.

== Culture ==
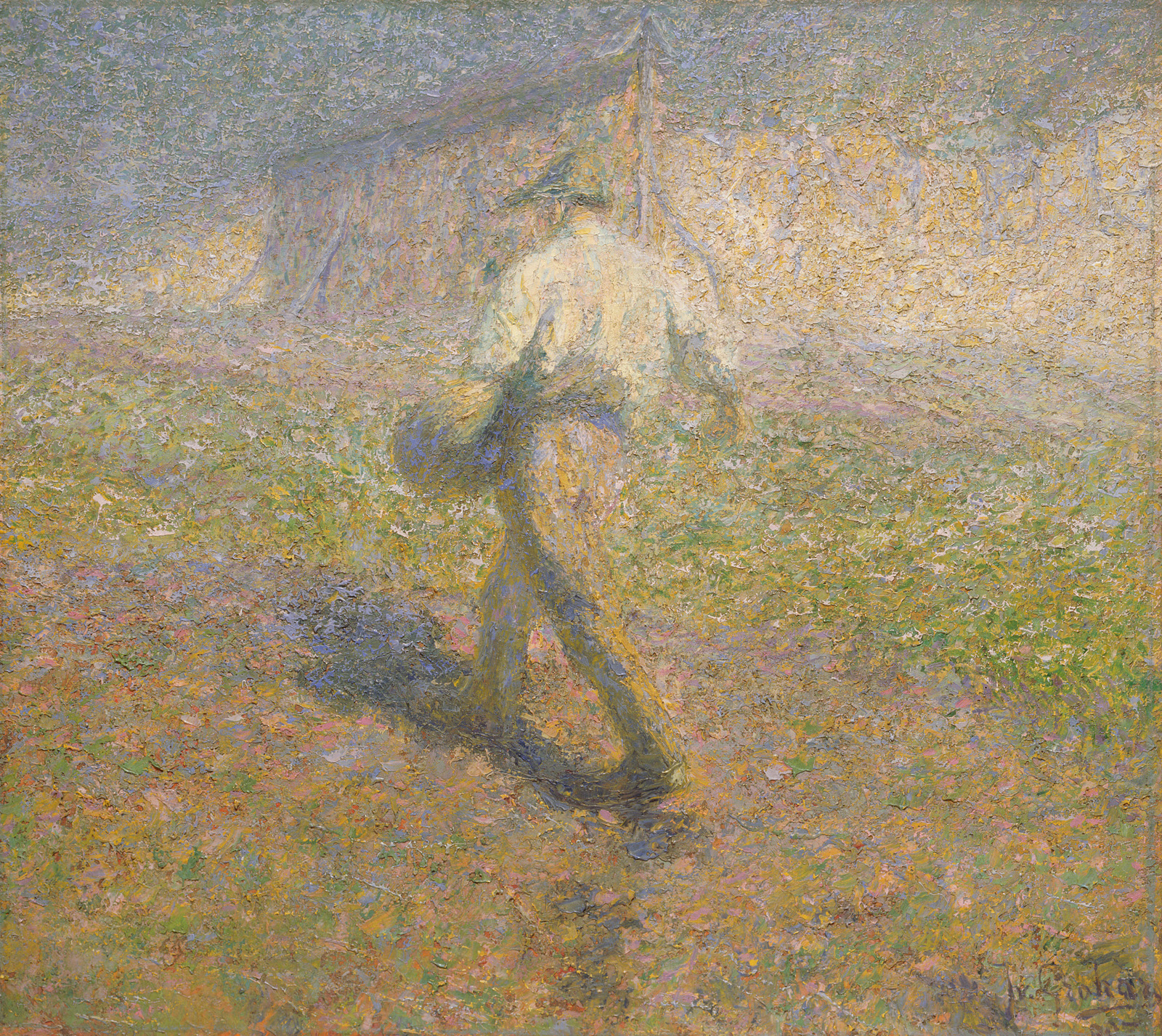
The Sower (1907), by the Impressionist painter Ivan Grohar, became a metaphor for Slovenes and was a reflection of the transition from a rural to an urban culture.

=== Heritage ===
Slovenia's architectural heritage includes 2,500 churches, 1,000 castles, ruins, and manor houses, farmhouses, and special structures for drying hay, called hayracks (kozolci).

Four natural and cultural sites in Slovenia are on the UNESCO World Heritage Site list. Škocjan Caves and its karst landscape are a protected site, as are the old forests in the area of Goteniški Snežnik and Kočevski Rog in SE Slovenia. The Idrija Mercury mining site is of world importance, as are the prehistoric pile dwellings in the Ljubljana Marsh.

The most picturesque church for photographers is the medieval and Baroque building on Bled Island. Near Postojna, there is a fortress called Predjama Castle, half hidden in a cave. Museums in Ljubljana and elsewhere feature unique items, such as the Divje Babe flute (argued by some to be the oldest discovered musical instrument) and the oldest wheel in the world. Ljubljana has medieval, Baroque, Art Nouveau, and modern architecture. The work of architect Plečnik, including his innovative paths and bridges along the Ljubljanica, are notable and on UNESCO's tentative list.

=== Cuisine ===
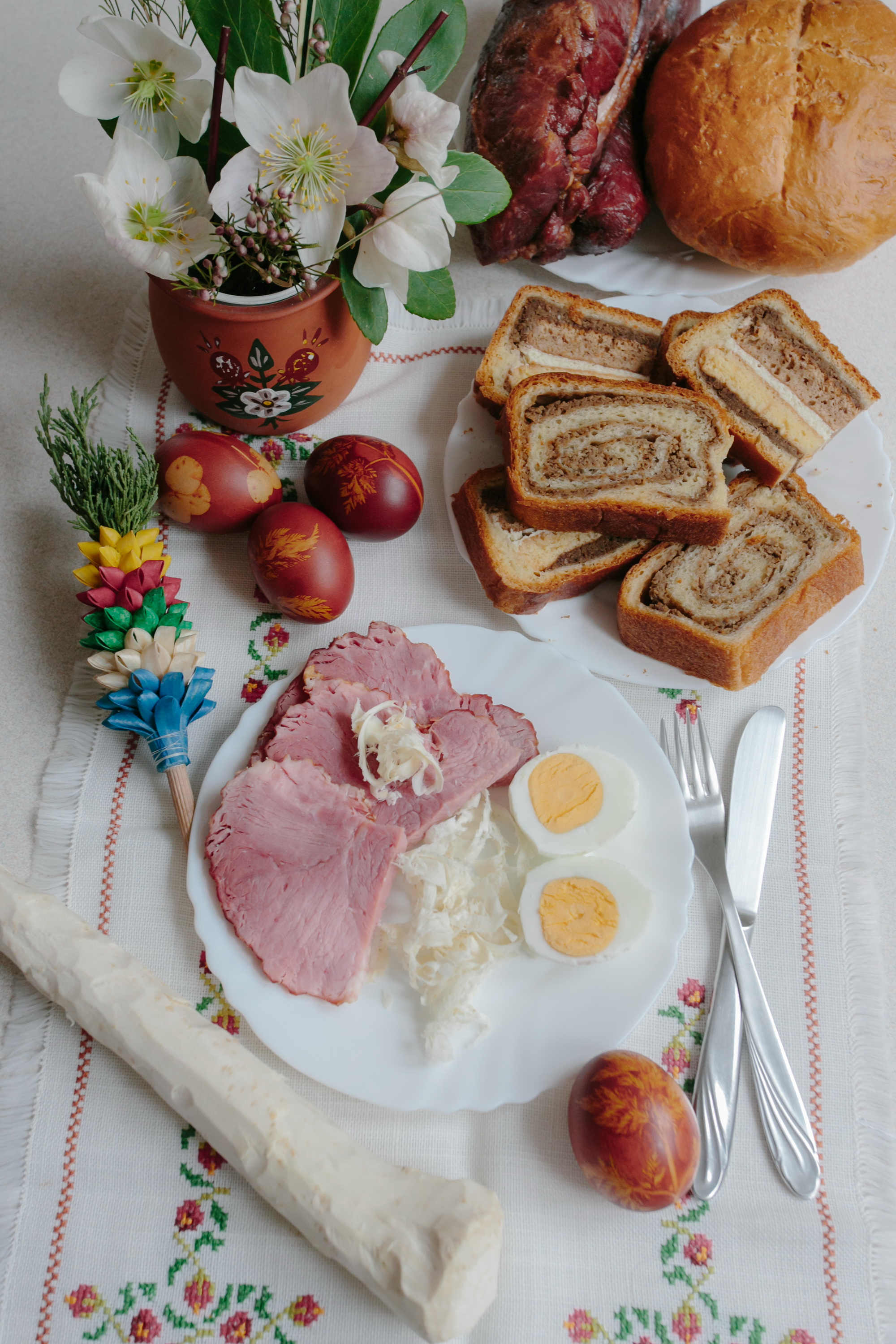
Potica as part of a traditional Slovenian Easter breakfast.

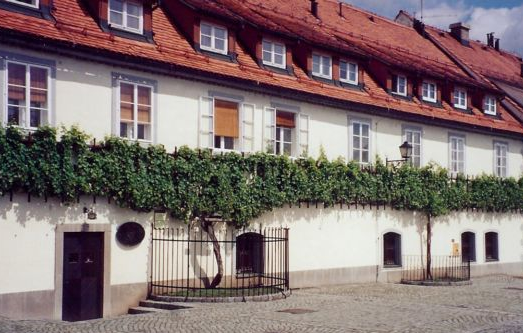
The more-than-400-year-old Žametovka vine growing outside the Old Vine House in Maribor. To the right is a daughter vine propagated from a cutting of the original vine.

Slovenian cuisine combines culinary traditions from Central Europe, particularly Austria and Hungary, with influences from the Mediterranean. Regional diversity reflects the country's varied geography and historical development. Slovenian cuisine is frequently described as Central European, with cultural commentators highlighting its Austrian and Hungarian influences while distinguishing it from Balkan culinary traditions.

The country's coastal areas, especially the Slovenian part of the Istria peninsula and the Adriatic littoral, have been strongly influenced by Mediterranean food traditions. In these regions, local cuisine incorporates elements of both Italian and Croatian gastronomy alongside indigenous Slovenian dishes.

Historically, Slovenian cuisine was divided into several culinary traditions, including urban, farmhouse, cottage, castle, parsonage and monastic cuisines. Owing to the country's cultural and geographic diversity, more than 40 regional cuisines have been identified.

Ethnological studies identify one-pot dishes as among the most characteristic elements of Slovenian cuisine. These include ričet, Istrian stew (jota), minestrone (mineštra), and žganci, a buckwheat spoonbread. In the Prekmurje region, notable traditional dishes include bujta repa and the layered pastry prekmurska gibanica. Prosciutto (pršut) is a well-known specialty of the Slovene Littoral. The potica, a type of nut roll, has become one of Slovenia's best-known national dishes, particularly among the Slovene diaspora in the United States. Soups were incorporated into traditional meals comparatively late, supplementing earlier diets centred on one-pot dishes, porridges, and stews.

Since 2000, the Roasted Potato Festival has been held annually by the Society for the Recognition of Roasted Potatoes as a Distinct Dish. Roasted potatoes, traditionally served in many Slovenian households on Sundays, were featured on a special series of postage stamps issued by the Post of Slovenia in 2012. Another well-known traditional product is kranjska klobasa. Slovenia is also home to the world's oldest known productive grapevines, estimated to be more than 400 years old.

Slovenia was awarded the title of European Region of Gastronomy for 2021.

=== Dance ===
Historically, the most notable Slovenian ballet dancers and choreographers were Pino Mlakar, who graduated in 1927 from the Rudolf Laban Choreographic Institute, and balerina Maria Luiza Pia Beatrice Scholz, who met at the Institute and later married. Together they worked as a leading dancer and a choreographer in Dessau, Zürich, and State opera in Munich. Their plan to build a Slovenian dance centre at Rožnik Hill after the World War II was supported by the minister of culture, Ferdo Kozak, but was cancelled by his successor. Pino Mlakar was also a full professor at the Academy for Theatre, Radio, Film and Television (AGRFT) of the University of Ljubljana.

Meta Vidmar, a student of Mary Wigman, founded a modern dance school in the 1930s, in Ljubljana.

=== Festivals, book fairs, and other events ===
A number of music, theatre, film, book, and children's festivals take place in Slovenia each year, including the music festivals Ljubljana Summer Festival and Lent Festival, the stand-up comedy Punch Festival, the children's Pippi Longstocking Festival, and book festivals Slovene book fair and Frankfurt after the Frankfurt.

Historically, the most notable music festival of Slovene music was the Slovenska popevka festival. Between 1981 and 2000, the Novi Rock festival was notable for bringing rock music across the Iron Curtain from the West to the Slovenian and then-Yugoslav audience. The long tradition of jazz festivals in Titoist Yugoslavia began with the Ljubljana Jazz Festival, which has been held annually in Slovenia since 1960.

=== Film ===
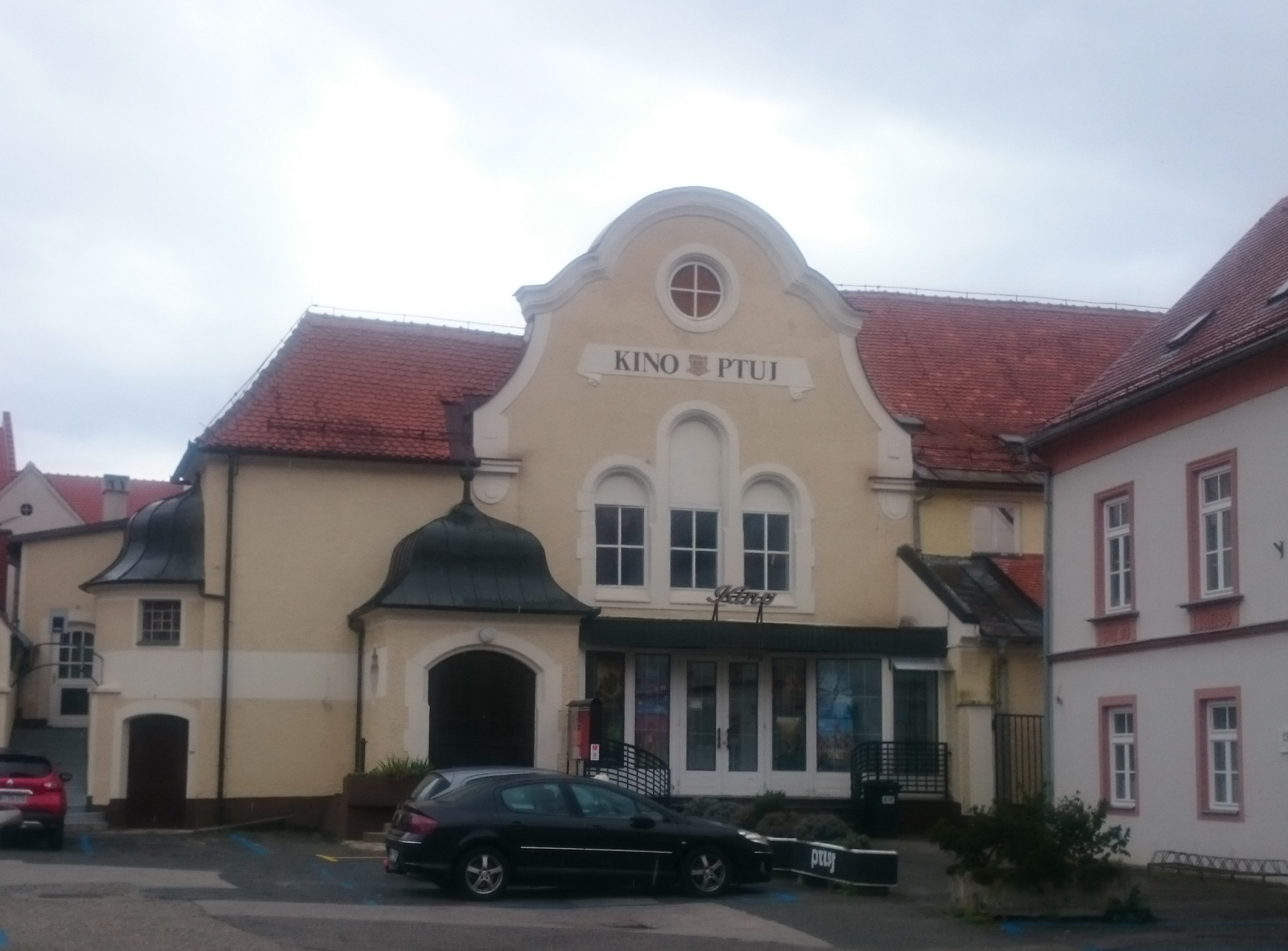
Ptuj City Cinema (from 3 March 1897) is the oldest active commercial movie theatre in the world.

Historical Slovene film actors and actresses include Ida Kravanja, who was known professionally as Ita Rina in the early European films, and Metka Bučar. After World War II, one of the most notable film actors was Polde Bibič, who played a number of roles in many films that were well received in Slovenia, and also performed in television and radio drama.

The most established filmmakers of feature film and short film production in Slovenia include: Karol Grossmann, František Čap, France Štiglic, Igor Pretnar, Jože Pogačnik, Peter Zobec, Matjaž Klopčič, Boštjan Hladnik, Dušan Jovanović, Vitan Mal, Franci Slak, and Karpo Godina. Contemporary film directors, such as Filip Robar Dorin, Jan Cvitkovič, Damjan Kozole, Janez Lapajne, Mitja Okorn, and Marko Naberšnik, are among the representatives of the so-called "Renaissance of Slovenian cinema". Slovene screenwriters who are not film directors, include Saša Vuga and Miha Mazzini. Women film directors include Polona Sepe, Hanna A. W. Slak, and Maja Weiss.

=== Literature ===
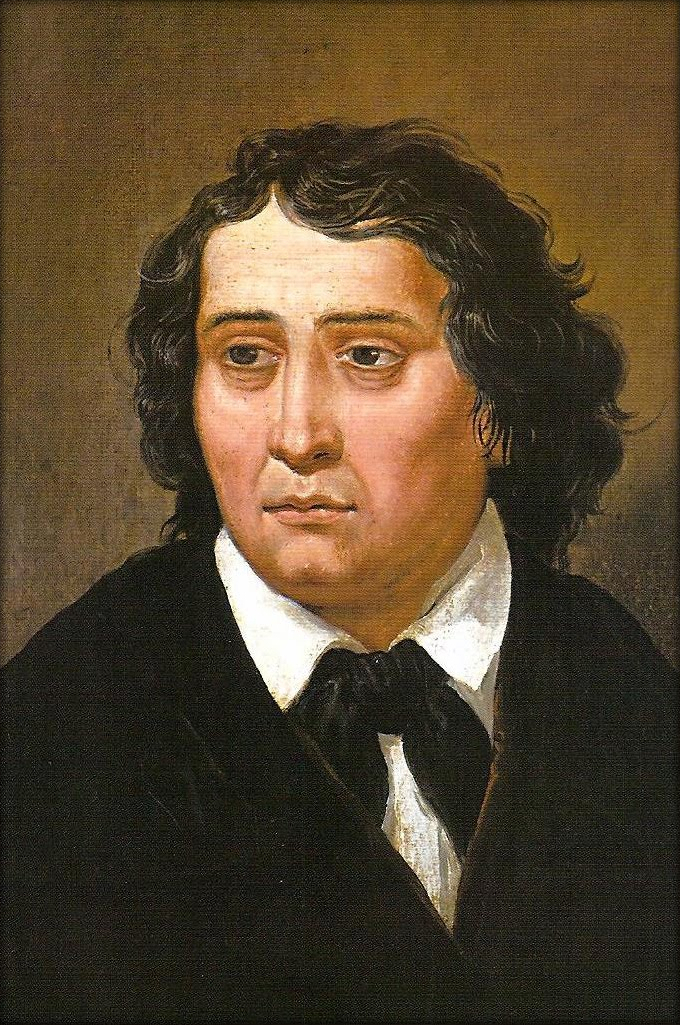
France Prešeren, best-known Slovenian poet.

The history of Slovene literature began in the 16th century with Primož Trubar and other Protestant Reformers. Slovene-language poetry achieved its highest level with the Romantic poet France Prešeren. In the 20th century, Slovene literary fiction went through several periods, some of which are tied to the World War periods.

- The beginning of the century was marked by the authors of Slovene Modernism, with the most influential Slovene writer and playwright, Ivan Cankar.
- Before World War II, Expressionism (Srečko Kosovel), Avant-gardism (Anton Podbevšek, Ferdo Delak) and Social realism (Ciril Kosmač, Prežihov Voranc) followed the modernist period.
- During the war, poetry of resistance and revolution was central to the works of Karel Destovnik Kajuh and Matej Bor.
- After the war, poetry was characterised by the Intimism (Poems of the Four, 1953), post-war modernism (Edvard Kocbek), and Existentialism (Dane Zajc).

Postmodernist authors also include Boris A. Novak, Marko Kravos, Drago Jančar, Evald Flisar, Tomaž Šalamun, and Brina Svit.

Among the best known post-1990 authors are Aleš Debeljak, Miha Mazzini, and Alojz Ihan. Today, notable authors include Slavoj Žižek, Mladen Dolar, Alenka Zupančič, and Boris Pahor. There are several literary magazines that publish Slovene prose, poetry, essays, and local literary criticism.

=== Music ===
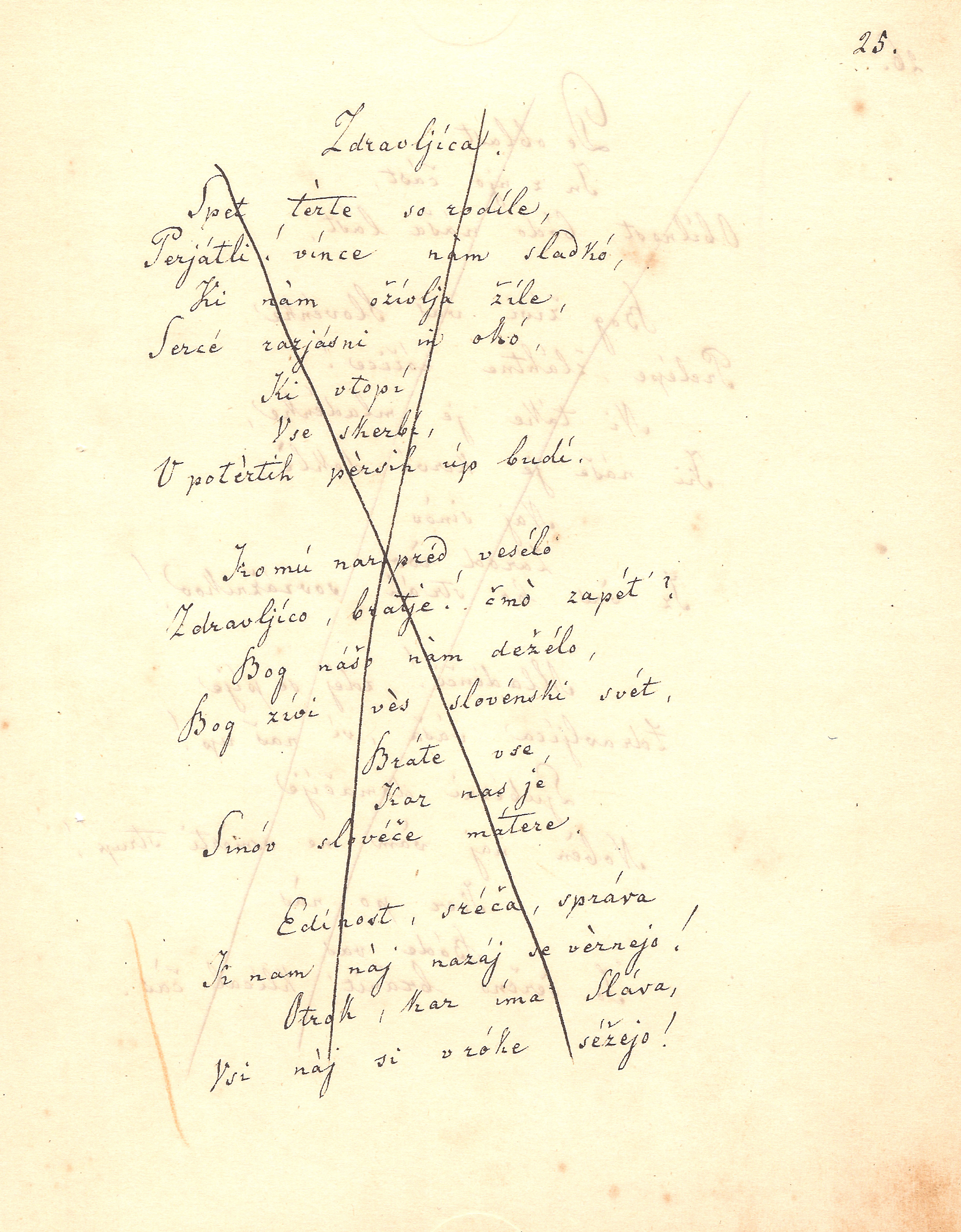
"Zdravljica" (A Toast; part) with rejection mark from Austrian censorship due to potential revolutionary content; the music of Zdravljica is now the Slovenian national anthem.

Music of Slovenia historically includes numerous musicians and composers, such as the Renaissance composer Jacobus Gallus, who greatly influenced Central European classical music, the Baroque composer Joannes Baptista Dolar, and the violin virtuoso Giuseppe Tartini. The first Slovenian hymnal, Eni Psalmi, was published in 1567. This period saw the rise of musicians like Jacobus Gallus and George Slatkonia. In 1701, Johann Berthold von Höffer founded the Academia Philharmonicorum Labacensis, as one of the oldest such institutions in Europe, based on Italian models.

Composers of Slovenian Lieder and art songs include Emil Adamič, Fran Gerbič, Alojz Geržinič, Benjamin Ipavec, Davorin Jenko, Anton Lajovic, Kamilo Mašek, Josip Pavčič, Zorko Prelovec, and Lucijan Marija Škerjanc.

In the early 20th century, Impressionism was spreading across Slovenia, which soon produced composers such as Marij Kogoj and Slavko Osterc. Avant-garde classical music arose in Slovenia in the 1960s, largely due to the work of Uroš Krek, Dane Škerl, Primož Ramovš, and Ivo Petrić, who also conducted the Slavko Osterc Ensemble. Modern composers include Brina Jež-Brezavšček, Božidar Kantušer, and Aldo Kumar.

The Slovene National Opera and Ballet Theatre serves as the national opera and ballet house. The Slovenian Philharmonics, established in 1701 as part of Academia operosorum Labacensis, is among the oldest such institutions in Europe.

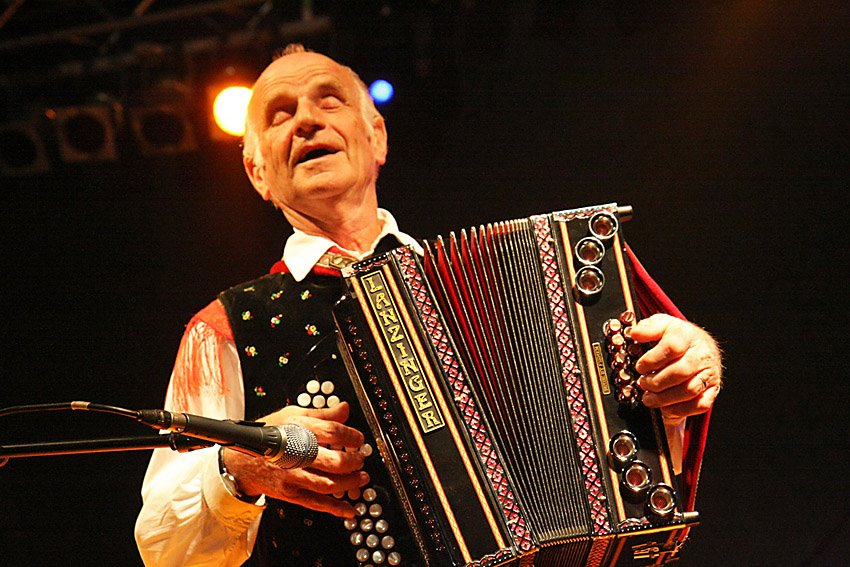
Folk musician Lojze Slak.

Harmony singing is a deep rooted tradition in Slovenia and has at least three-part singing (four voices), while some regions have up to eight-part singing (nine voices). Slovenian folk songs, thus, usually sound soft and harmonious, and are very seldom in minor. Traditional Slovenian folk music is performed on Styrian harmonica (the oldest type of accordion), fiddle, clarinet, zithers, flute, and by brass bands of alpine type. In eastern Slovenia, fiddle and cimbalon bands are called velike goslarije. From 1952 on, the Slavko Avsenik's band began to appear in broadcasts, films, and concerts across West Germany, inventing the original "Oberkrainer" country sound. The band produced nearly 1000 original compositions, an integral part of the Slovenian-style polka legacy. Many musicians followed Avsenik's steps, including folk musician Lojze Slak.

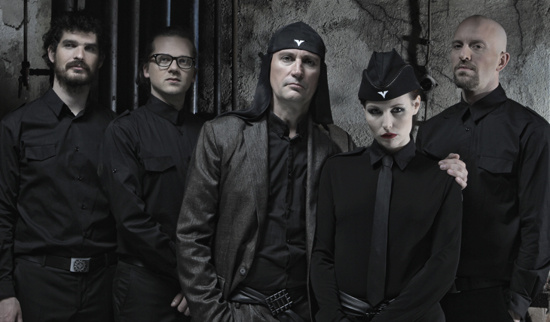
The industrial group Laibach.

Among pop, rock, industrial, and indie musicians, the most popular in Slovenia include industrial music group Laibach, as well as Siddharta, a rock band formed in 1995. Perpetuum Jazzile is the Slovenian group that has the largest international, online listeners, with a YouTube video of their a cappella rendition of "Africa" being viewed over 24 million times (as of October 2026) since its publishing in May 2009. Other Slovenian bands include historically progressive rock groups that were also popular in Titoist Yugoslavia, such as Buldožer and Lačni Franz, which later inspired comedy rock bands including Zmelkoow, Slon in Sadež, and Mi2.

With exception of the folk band Terrafolk who have made appearances worldwide, other bands, such as Avtomobili, Zaklonišče Prepeva, Šank Rock, Big Foot Mama, Dan D, and Zablujena generacija, are mostly unknown outside the country. Slovenian metal bands include Negligence (thrash metal), Naio Ssaion (gothic metal), and Within Destruction (deathcore). Slovenian post-WWII singer-songwriters include Frane Milčinski, Tomaž Pengov (whose 1973 album Odpotovanja is considered to be the first singer-songwriter album in former Yugoslavia), Marko Brecelj, Eva Sršen, Neca Falk, and Jani Kovačič. After 1990, Adi Smolar, Iztok Mlakar, Vita Mavrič, Vlado Kreslin, Zoran Predin, Peter Lovšin, and Magnifico have been popular in Slovenia, as well. In the 21st century, there have been many successful artists from Slovenia, including country musician Manu, Zalagasper, Nika Zorjan, Omar Naber, Raiven, and Joker Out.

=== Theatre ===
The National Theatre in Ljubljana.

Theater has a rich tradition in Slovenia, starting with the first ever Slovene-language drama performance in 1867. In addition to the main houses, which include Slovene National Theatre, Ljubljana and Maribor Slovene Drama Theatre, a number of small producers are active in Slovenia, including physical theatre (e.g. Betontanc), street theatre (e.g. Ana Monró Theatre), theatresports championship Impro League, and improvisational theatre (e.g. IGLU Theatre). A popular form is puppetry, mainly performed in the Ljubljana Puppet Theatre.

=== Visual arts, architecture and design ===
Slovenia's visual arts, architecture, and design are shaped by a number of architects, designers, painters, sculptors, photographers, graphics artists, as well as comics, illustration, and conceptual artists. Two significant prestigious institutions exhibiting works of Slovene visual artists are the National Gallery of Slovenia and the Museum of Modern Art.

Modern architecture in Slovenia was introduced by Max Fabiani, and in the mid-war period by Jože Plečnik and Ivan Vurnik. In the second half of the 20th century, the national and universal style were merged by the architects Edvard Ravnikar and the first generation of his students: Milan Mihelič, Stanko Kristl, and Savin Sever. The next generation is mainly still active, including Marko Mušič, Vojteh Ravnikar, and Jurij Kobe. Selected works of Jože Plečnik which shaped Ljubljana during the inter-war period were inscribed on UNESCO's list of World Heritage Sites in 2021.

A number of conceptual visual art groups formed, including OHO, Group 69, and IRWIN. Nowadays, the Slovene visual arts are diverse, based on tradition, reflect the influence of neighbouring nations, and are intertwined with modern European movements.

Internationally, most notable Slovenian design items include the 1952 Rex chair (a wooden chair inspired by Scandinavian design) by interior designer Niko Kralj, which was given a permanent place in Designmuseum, Denmark (the largest museum of design in Scandinavia) in 2012. The chair is also included in the collection of the Museum of Modern Art (MOMA) in New York City. An industrial design item that has changed the international ski industry is Elan SCX by Elan company.

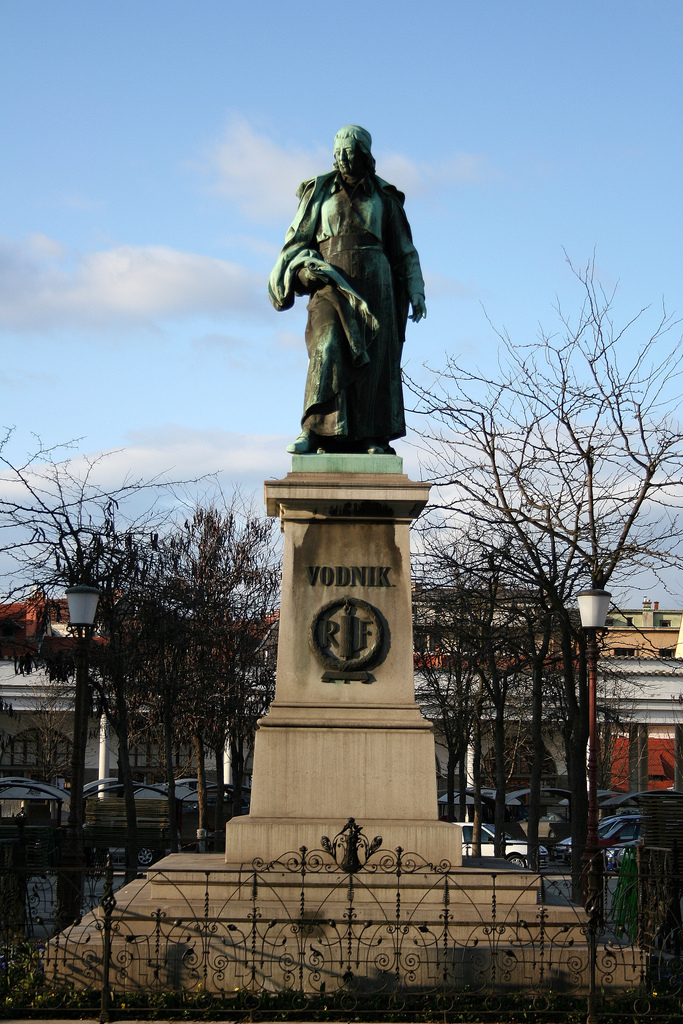
The sculpture of the poet Valentin Vodnik was created by Alojz Gangl in 1889 as part of Vodnik Monument, the first Slovene national monument.

The renewal of Slovene sculpture begun with Alojz Gangl, who created sculptures for the public monuments of the Carniolan polymath Johann Weikhard von Valvasor and Valentin Vodnik, the first Slovene poet and journalist, as well as The Genius of the Theatre and other statues for the Slovenian National Opera and Ballet Theatre building. The development of sculpture after World War II was led by a number of artists, including brothers Boris and Zdenko Kalin; Jakob Savinšek stayed with figural art. Younger sculptors, for example Janez Boljka, Drago Tršar, and particularly Slavko Tihec, moved towards abstract forms. Jakov Brdar and Mirsad Begić returned to human figures.

During World War II, numerous graphics were created by Božidar Jakac, who helped establish the post-war Academy of Visual Arts in Ljubljana.

In 1917, Hinko Smrekar illustrated Fran Levstik's book about the well-known Slovene folk hero Martin Krpan. The children's books illustrators include a number of women illustrators, such as Marlenka Stupica, Marija Lucija Stupica, Ančka Gošnik Godec, Marjanca Jemec Božič, and Jelka Reichman.

In the late 18th and the 19th century, painting and sculpture in Slovenia was marked by Neoclassicism (Matevž Langus), Biedermeier (Giuseppe Tominz) and Romanticism (Michael Stroy). The first art exhibition in Slovenia was organized in the late 19th century by Ivana Kobilca. Impressionist artists include Matej Sternen, Matija Jama, Rihard Jakopič, Ivan Grohar (whose The Sower–in Slovene: Sejalec–was depicted on the €0.05 Slovenian euro coins), and Franc Berneker, who introduced impressionism to Slovenia. Expressionist painters include Veno Pilon and Tone Kralj, whose picture book, reprinted thirteen times, is now the most recognisable image of Martin Krpan. Some of the best known painters in the second half of the 20th century were Zoran Mušič and Marij Pregelj.

In 1841, Johann Pucher invented a process for photography on glass, recognized on 17 June 1852 in Paris by the Académie Nationale Agricole, Manufacturière et Commerciale. Gojmir Anton Kos was a notable realist painter and photographer between the First and Second World Wars.

=== Sports ===
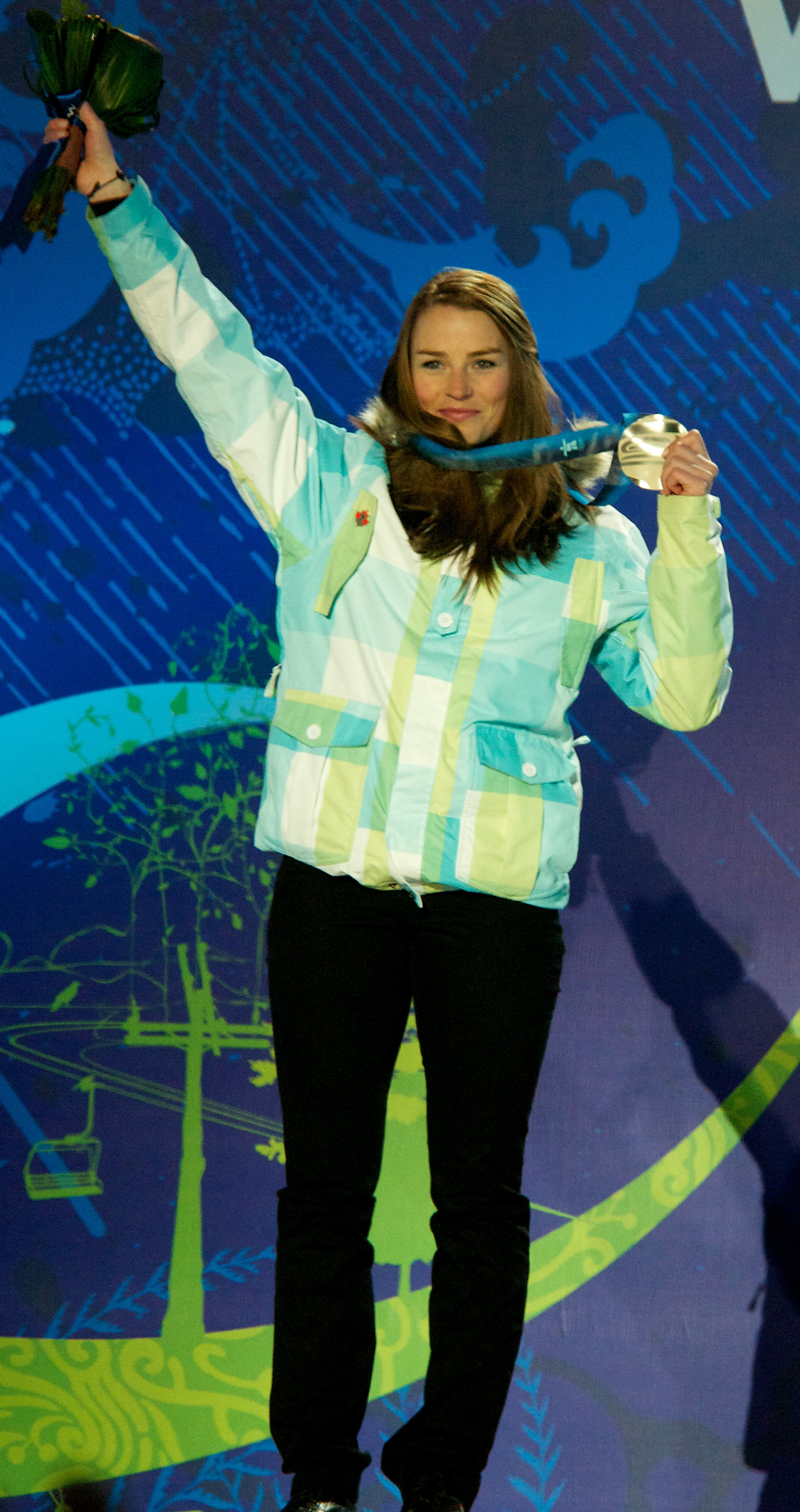
Alpine skier Tina Maze, a double Olympic gold medalist and the overall winner of the 2012–13 World Cup season.

Slovenia has a geography that allows for a variety of sports, with many Slovenians actively practicing sports. Many sports are played on a professional level, with international successes in handball, basketball, volleyball, football, ice hockey, rowing, swimming, tennis, boxing, climbing, road cycling, and athletics. Prior to World War II, gymnastics and fencing used to be the most popular sports in Slovenia, with athletes like Leon Štukelj and Miroslav Cerar earning gold Olympic medals. Football gained popularity in the interwar period. After 1945, basketball, handball and volleyball have become popular among Slovenians, and winter sports are popular since the mid-1970s. Since 1992, Slovenian sportspeople have won 59 Olympic medals, including 16 gold medals, and 26 Paralympic medals with five golds.

Individual sports are also popular in Slovenia, including tennis and mountaineering, which are two of the most widespread sporting activities in Slovenia. Several Slovenian extreme and endurance sportsmen have gained an international reputation, including the mountaineer Tomaž Humar, the mountain skier Davo Karničar, the ultramarathon swimmer Martin Strel, and the ultracyclist Jure Robič. Past and current winter sports athletes include alpine skiers, such as Mateja Svet, Bojan Križaj, Ilka Štuhec, and double Olympic gold medalist Tina Maze, cross-country skier Petra Majdič, and ski jumpers such as Primož Peterka and Peter Prevc. Boxing has gained popularity since Jan Zaveck won the IBF Welterweight World Champion title in 2009. In 2021, rock climber Janja Garnbret became the first female Olympic gold medalist in sport climbing.

In cycling, Primož Roglič became the first Slovenian to win a Grand Tour when he won the 2019 Vuelta a España. Additionally, Tadej Pogačar is a five-time winner (2020, 2021, 2024, 2025, and 2026) of the Tour de France, the world's most competitive cycling race.

Prominent team sports in Slovenia include football, basketball, handball, volleyball, and ice hockey. The men's national football team has qualified for two European Championships (2000 and 2024) and two World Cups (2002 and 2010). Of Slovenian clubs, NK Maribor played three times in the group stages of the UEFA Champions League. The men's national basketball team has participated at 15 EuroBaskets, winning the gold medal in the 2017 edition, and at four FIBA World Championships. Slovenia also hosted the EuroBasket 2013. The men's national handball team has qualified for four Olympics, eleven IHF World Championships, including their third-place finish in 2017, and fifteen European Championships. Slovenia was the host of the 2004 European Championship, where the national team won the silver medal. Slovenia's most prominent handball team, RK Celje, won the EHF Champions League in the 2003–04 season. In women's handball, RK Krim won the Champions League in 2001 and 2003. The men's national volleyball team has won three silver medals at the European Volleyball Championship, and finished fourth at the 2022 World Championship. The national ice hockey team has participated in 32 Ice Hockey World Championships, with 12 appearances in the highest division.

== See also ==
- Outline of Slovenia
