= Culture of Slovenia =

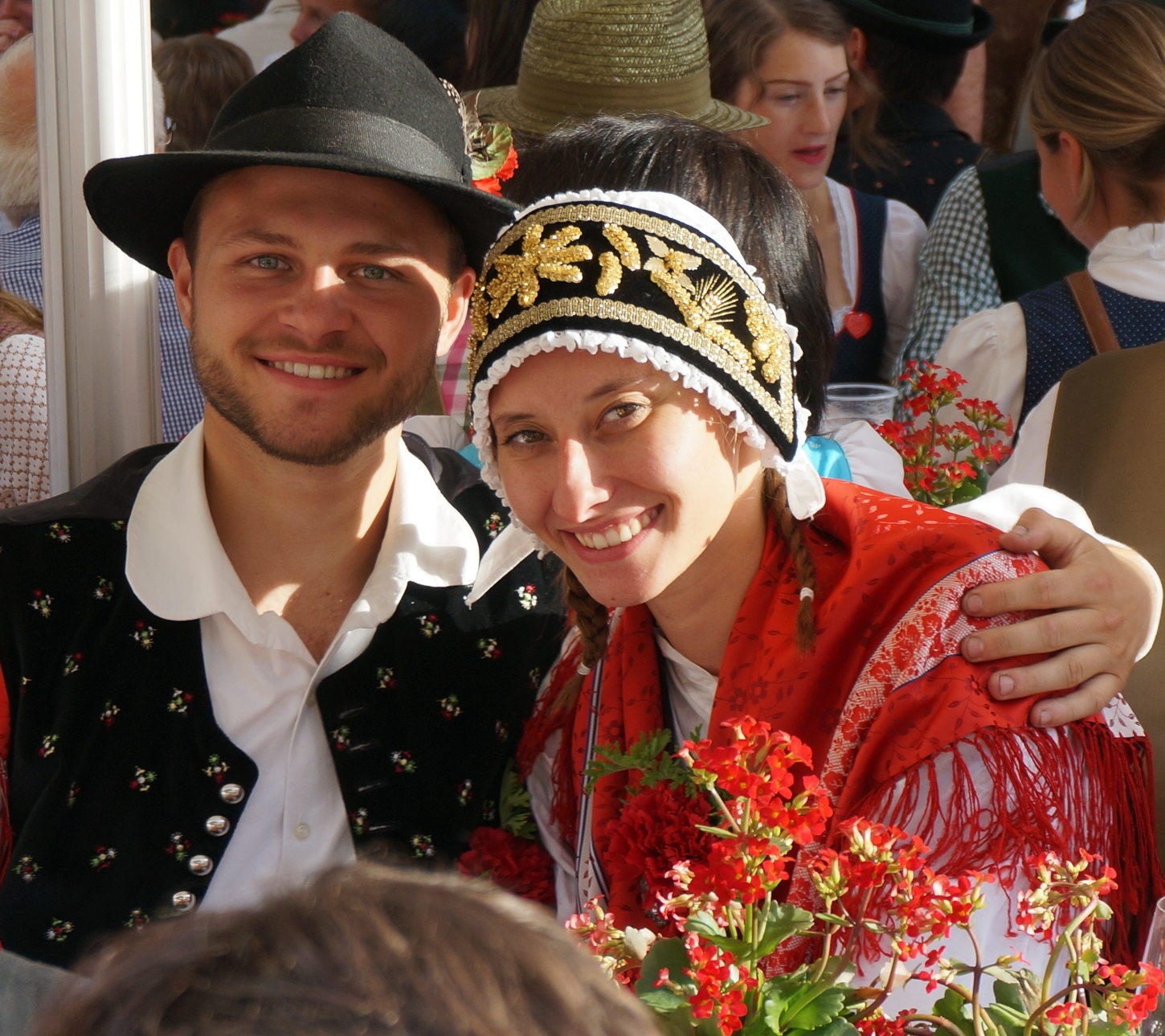
Traditional clothing and headgear of folk group in Kranj

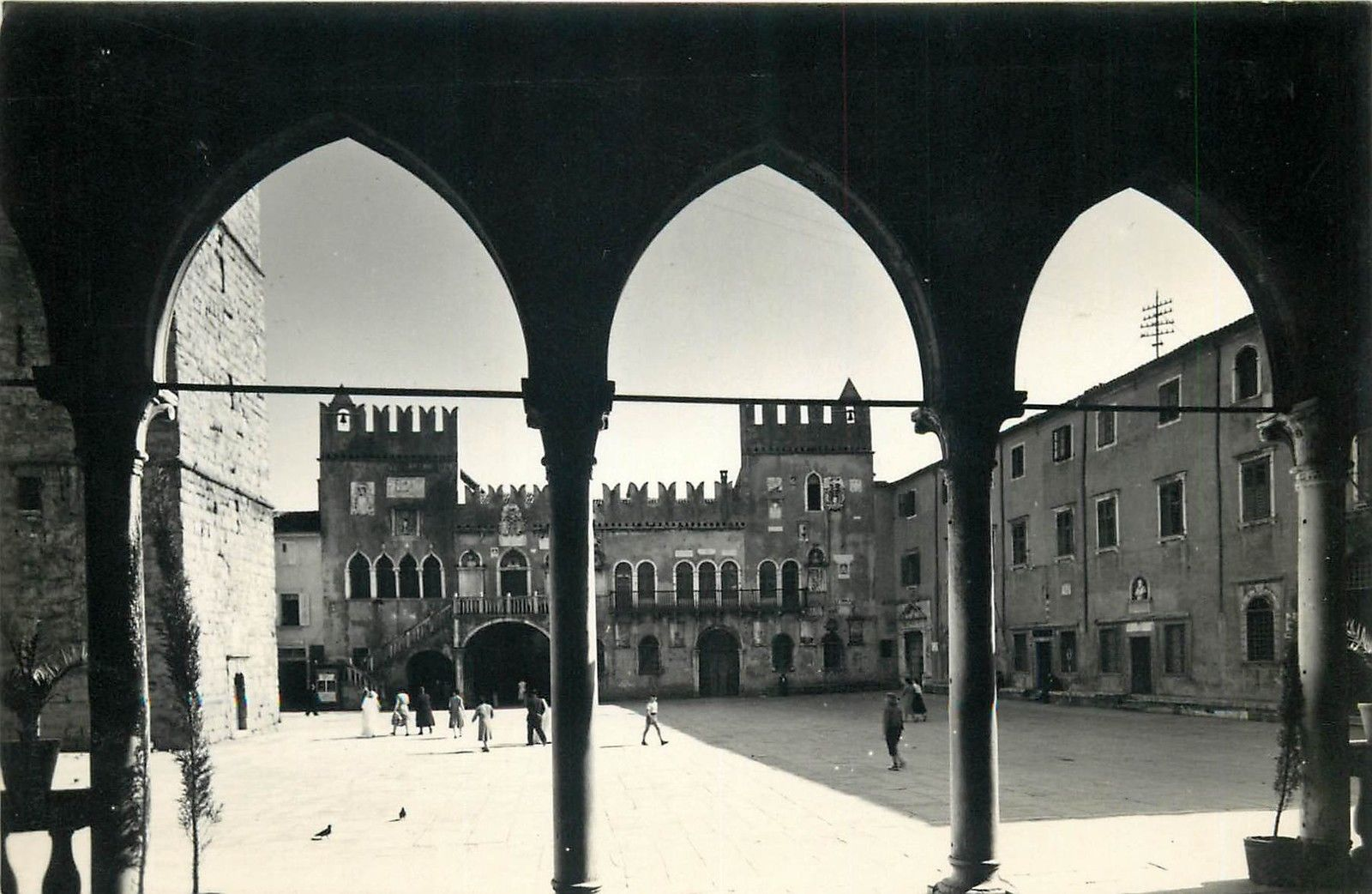
Praetorian Palace in the 19th century

The Slovenes, a South Slavic ethnic group, have incredibly diverse culture for the country's small size which spans the southern portion of Central Europe, and acts as a melting pot of Slavic, Germanic and Romance cultures while encompassing parts of the Eastern Alps, the Pannonian Basin, the Balkan Peninsula and the Mediterranean.

Throughout history, the territory of Slovenia has been home to a number of civilizations and its territory has been included in various European kingdoms and empires. Notably, Slovenia, alongside Bosnia and Herzegovina, Croatia, Montenegro, North Macedonia and Serbia, was a constituent of the Kingdom of Yugoslavia for the majority of the 20th century. Slovenia’s culture is expressed through its history, traditions, literature, mythology, music, dance, literature, cuisine, sports, arts, film, theatre, monuments and more. The country is also home to multiple UNESCO World Heritage Sites. The Freising manuscripts comprised the first Latin-script continuous text in a Slavic language. Created in the late 10th century, it is also one of the oldest known Slovene documents.

The ancestors of Slovenes were Slavic inhabitants of the Slovenia and southern Austria, called Carantanians. They were the first Slavic people in history to form a principality, which was aptly named Carantania, and had an enduring cultural impact on the regions it encompassed.

Carantania was one of the first Slavic regions to be Christianized, and Slovenia’s national culture is deeply rooted in Christianity. While Roman Catholicism is the predominant Christian faith in Slovenia, the country is also home to sizeable Protestant community.

== Dance ==
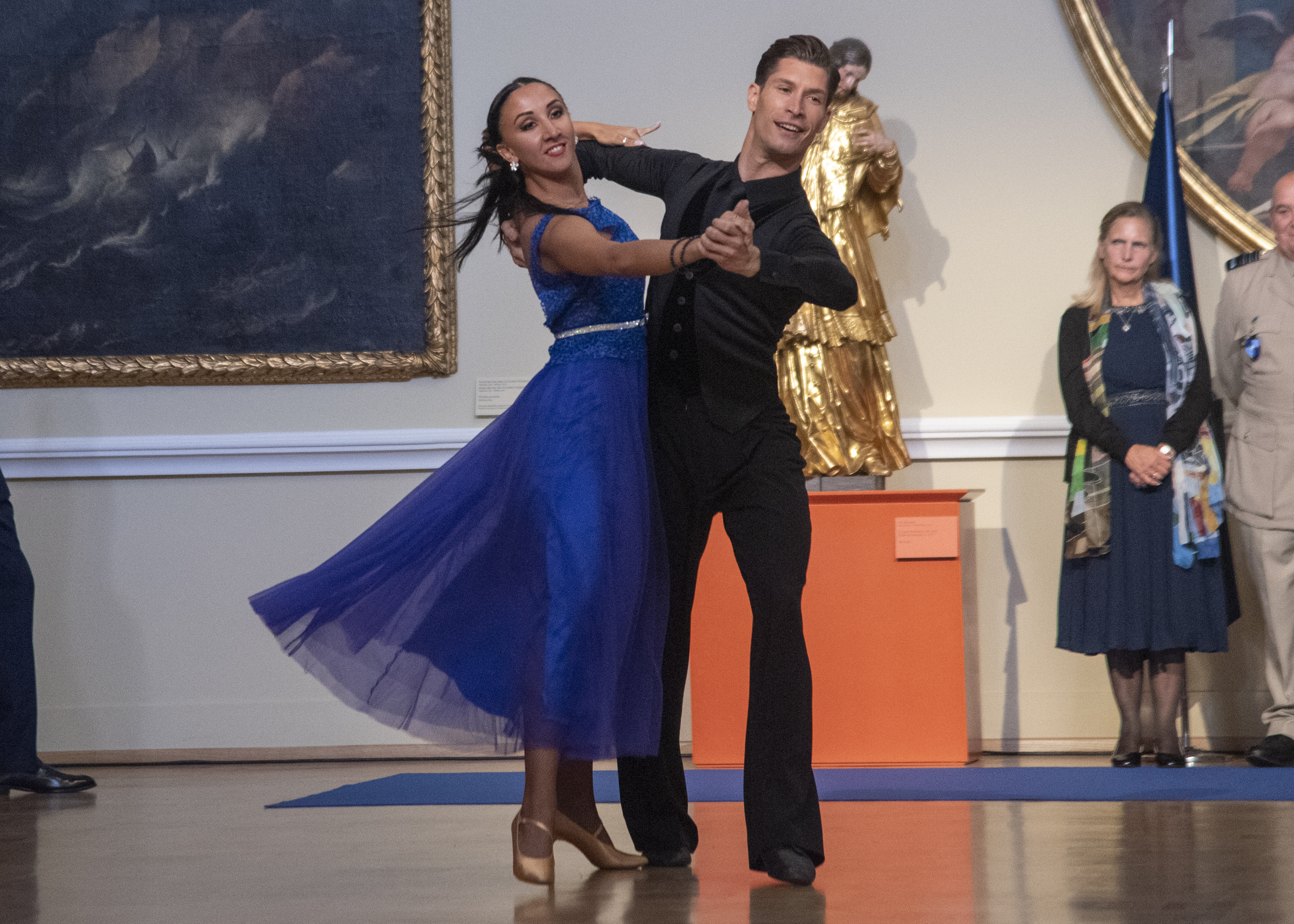
Slovenian dancers at the National Gallery in 2019

=== Ballet ===
Pino Mlakar and Pia Mlakar were the most notable ballet dancers and members of the Ljubljana Opera and Ballet Company from 1946 to 1960. Pino Mlakar was also a full professor at the Academy for Theatre, Radio, Film, and Television (AGRFT) of the University of Ljubljana.

=== Modern dance ===
In the 1930s in Ljubljana was founded a Mary Wigman dance school by her student Meta Vidmar.

=== Folk dance ===
Folk dances in Slovenia include polka, waltz, and many regional specifics.

== Festivals, book fairs, and other events ==
A number of music, theater, film, book, and children's festivals takes place in Slovenia each year. In 2012, Maribor was the European Capital of Culture.

=== Music Festivals ===
Music festivals include the Ljubljana Summer Festival and Lent Festival. Historically, among the most popular music festivals was the Slovenska popevka festival. Between 1981 and 2000, the Novi Rock festival was notable for bringing rock music across the Iron Curtain from the West to the Slovenian and then Yugoslav audience. In Titoist Yugoslavia, Jazz festival Ljubljana right after World War II has begun the long tradition of Jazz festivals in Slovenia.

=== Comedy Festivals ===
The best-known stand-up comedy festival is the Punch Festival in Ljubljana.

=== Children's Festivals ===
The children's festival celebrating the Pipi Longstocking character is the Pikin festival in Velenje.

=== Book Festivals ===
The book festivals include domestic Slovene book fair and foreign books Frankfurt po Frankfurtu Festival.

== Film ==
=== Film actors ===
Slovene film actors and actresses historically include Ida Kravanja, who played her roles as Ita Rina in the early European films, and Metka Bučar. After the WW II, one of the most notable film actors was Polde Bibič, who played a number of roles in many films that were well received in Slovenia, including Don't Cry, Peter (1964), On Wings of Paper (1968), Kekec's Tricks (1968), Flowers in Autumn (1973), The Widowhood of Karolina Žašler (1976), Heritage (1986), Primož Trubar (1985), and My Dad, The Socialist Kulak (1987). Many of these were directed by Matjaž Klopčič. He also performed in television and radio dramas. Altogether, Bibič played over 150 theatres and over 30 film roles.

=== Film directors ===
Film in Slovenia historically includes Karol Grossmann, František Čap, France Štiglic, Igor Pretnar, Jože Pogačnik, Peter Zobec, Matjaž Klopčič, Boštjan Hladnik, Dušan Jovanović, Vitan Mal, Franci Slak, and Karpo Godina as its most established filmmakers. Contemporary film directors Filip Robar - Dorin, Jan Cvitkovič, Damjan Kozole, Janez Lapajne, Marko Okorn, and Marko Naberšnik are among the representatives of the so-called "Renaissance of Slovenian cinema". Slovene screenwriters, who are not film directors, include Saša Vuga and Miha Mazzini. Women film directors include Polona Sepe, Hanna A. W. Slak, and Maja Weiss.

=== Documentaries ===
Most notable documentaries made by Slovenian directors include the humanitarian films by Tomo Križnar on the Nuba people.

=== Film criticism ===
Slovene film critics include Silvan Furlan, the founder of the Slovenian Cinematheque, Zdenko Vrdlovec, Marcel Štefančič Jr., and Simon Popek.

== Literary fiction, poetry, essays, and criticism ==
Around the year 1000, the Freising manuscripts were written, which are the first Latin-script continuous text in a Slavic language and the oldest document in Slovene.

Slovene writing in the Middle Ages was heavily influenced by Austrians and the German language, as they were continuously joined with them in various states.

Literature written in Slovene was founded in the 16th century by Primož Trubar, who wrote the first Slovene books Abecednik and Katekizem, and other Protestant Reformers, that formed the modern Slovene language out of the dialects of three central parts of Duchy of Carniola (Kranjska); Upper Carniola (Gorenjska), Inner Carniola (Notranjska) and Lower Carniola (Dolenjska).

Poetry in Slovene achieved its highest level with the Romantic poet France Prešeren (1800–1849). In the 20th century, the Slovene literary fiction went through several periods: the beginning of the century was marked by the authors of Slovene Modernism, with the most influential Slovene writer and playwright, Ivan Cankar; it was then followed by expressionism (Srečko Kosovel), avantgardism (Anton Podbevšek, Ferdo Delak) and social realism (Ciril Kosmač, Prežihov Voranc) before World War II, the poetry of resistance and revolution (Karel Destovnik Kajuh, Matej Bor) during the war, and intimism (Poems of the Four, 1953), post-war modernism (Edvard Kocbek), and existentialism (Dane Zajc) after the war. Short stories became a popular genre after the 1990s. There are several Slovene literary magazines that publish prose, poetry, essays, and local literary criticism.

== Music ==
=== Classical music ===
Music of Slovenia historically includes numerous musicians and composers, such as the Renaissance composer Jacobus Gallus (1550–1591), who greatly influenced Central European classical music, and the Baroque composer Joannes Baptista Dolar (ca. 1620–1673).

During the medieval era, secular music was as popular as church music, including wandering minnesingers. By the time of the Protestant Reformation in the 16th century, music was used to proselytize. The first Slovenian hymnal, Eni Psalmi, was published in 1567. This period saw the rise of musicians like Jacobus Gallus and George Slatkonia.

In 1701, Johann Berthold von Höffer (1667–1718), a nobleman and amateur composer from Ljubljana, founded the Academia Philharmonicorum Labacensis, as one of the oldest such institutions in Europe, based on Italian models.

Composers of Slovenian Lieder and art songs include Emil Adamič (1877–1936), Fran Gerbič (1840–1917), Alojz Geržinič (1915–2008), Benjamin Ipavec (1829–1908), Davorin Jenko (1835–1914), Anton Lajovic (1878–1960), Kamilo Mašek (1831–1859), Josip Pavčič (1870–1949), Zorko Prelovec (1887–1939), and Lucijan Marija Škerjanc (1900–1973).

In the early 20th century, impressionism was spreading across Slovenia, which soon produced composers Marij Kogoj and Slavko Osterc. Avant-garde classical music arose in Slovenia in the 1960s, largely due to the work of Uroš Krek, Dane Škerl, Primož Ramovš, and Ivo Petrić, who also conducted the Slavko Osterc Ensemble. Jakob Jež, Darijan Božič, Lojze Lebič, and Vinko Globokar have since composed enduring works, especially Globokar's L'Armonia, an opera.

Modern composers include Uroš Rojko, Tomaž Svete, Brina Jež-Brezavšček, Božidar Kantušer, and Aldo Kumar. Kumar's Sonata z igro 12 (A sonata with a play 12), a set of variations on a rising chromatic scale, is particularly notable.

=== Opera ===
The Slovene National Opera and Ballet Theatre serves as the national opera and ballet house.

=== Film music ===
The composer of film scoress for 170 films was Bojan Adamič (1912–1995).

=== Folk music ===
==== Vocal ====
Harmony singing is a deep-rooted tradition in Slovenia, and is at least three-part singing (four voices), while in some regions even up to eight-part singing (nine voices). Slovenian folk songs, thus, usually resounds soft and harmonious, and are very seldom in a minor. Slovene folk singers include Ana Ažbe, Katarina Zupančič, and Minca Krkovič.

==== Instrumental ====
Traditional Slovenian folk music is performed on Styrian accordion, fiddle, clarinet, zithers, flute, and by brass bands of alpine type. In eastern Slovenia, fiddle and cimbalon bands are called velike goslarije.

==== Slovenian country music ====
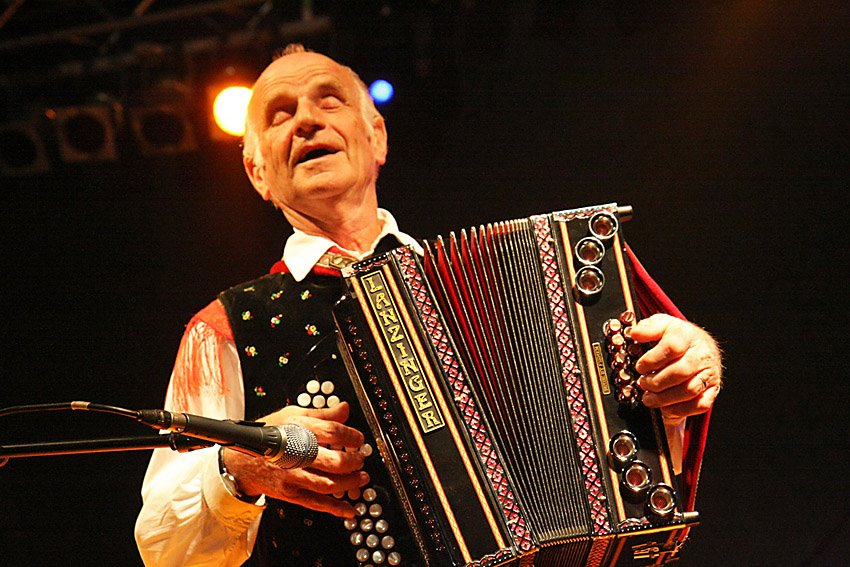
Folk musician Lojze Slak

From 1952 on, the Slavko Avsenik's band began to appear in broadcasts, movies, and concerts all over West Germany, inventing the original "Oberkrainer" country sound that has become the primary vehicle of ethnic musical expression not only in Slovenia, but also in Germany, Austria, Switzerland, and in the Benelux, spawning hundreds of Alpine orchestras in the process. The band produced nearly 1000 original compositions, an integral part of the Slovenian-style polka legacy. Avsenik's most popular instrumental composition is the polka that is titled "Na Golici" (in Slovene), or "Trompetenecho" (in German), and "Trumpet Echoes" (in English). Oberkrainer music, which the Avsenik Ensemble popularized, is always a strong candidate for the country (folk) music awards in Slovenia and Austria.

Many musicians followed Avsenik's steps, one of the most famous being Lojze Slak.

=== Slovenska popevka ===
A similarly high standing in Slovene culture, like the Sanremo Music Festival, has had in Italian culture, was attributed to the Slovenska popevka, a specific genre of popular Slovene music.

=== Popular music ===
Among pop, rock, industrial, and indie musicians, the most popular in Slovenia include Laibach, an early 1980s industrial music group, and most recently the Slovenian pop a cappella band Perpetuum Jazzile.

==== Pop, rock, metal, and indie music ====
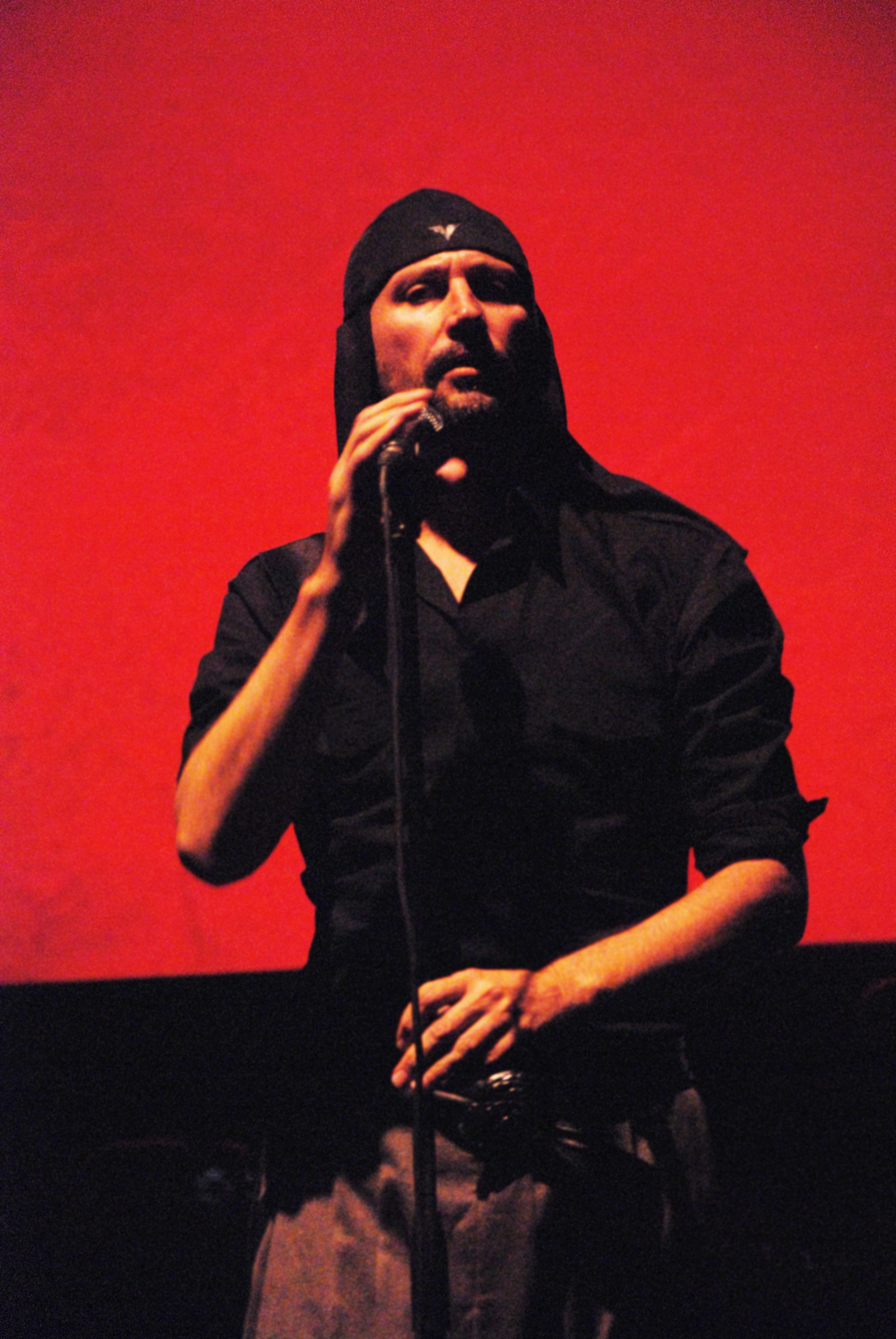
The industrial group Laibach during a performance in Koper, 2008

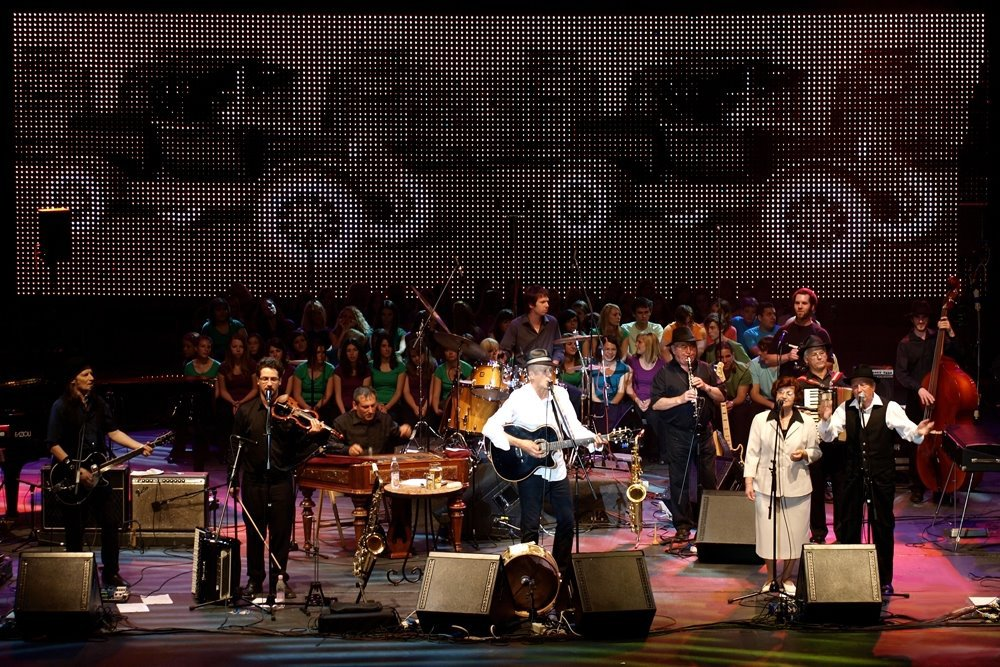
The folk rock singer-songwriter Vlado Kreslin during a concert at the Lent Festival in Maribor, 2009

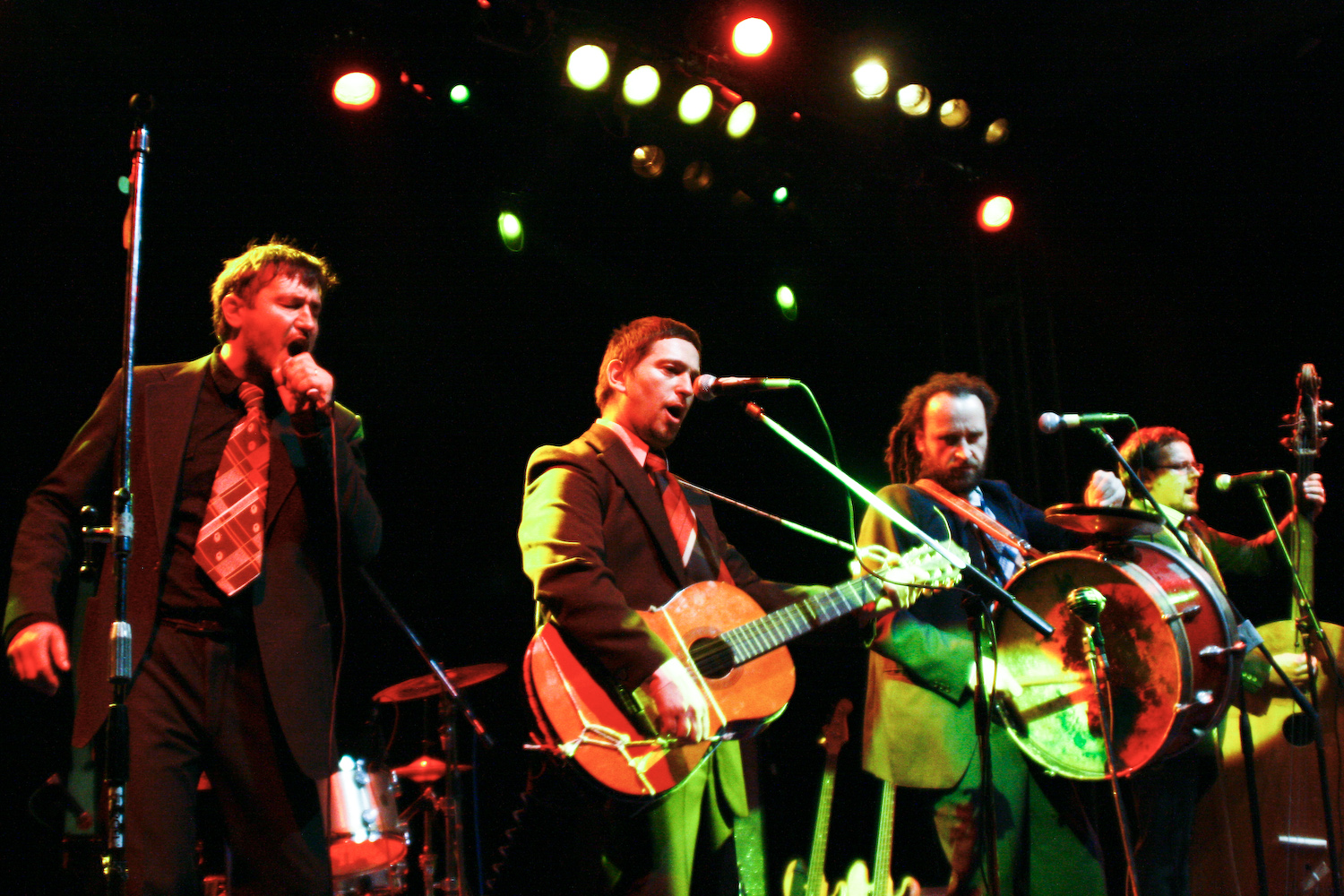
A performance of the folk rock group Ana Pupedan from Pivka

Other popular bands, most largely unknown outside the country, include Negligence (thrash metal), Elvis Jackson (ska punk), Lačni Franz, Bohem, Puppetz (Indie), Tabu, Društvo Mrtvih Pesnikov (pop-rock), Naio Ssaion (Gothic metal), Terrafolk, Leaf Fat (screamo), Avven, Perpetuum Jazzile, Carpe Diem, Šank Rock, Big Foot Mama, Yogurt, Levitan, Dan D, Time to time, Flirrt, Zablujena generacija, Slon in Sadež, Katalena, Rock Partyzani, Shyam, Eroika, Hic et Nunc, Devil Doll (experimental rock), Chateau, Posodi mi jürja, Rok'n'band, Čuki, Juliette Justine, Zaklonišče Prepeva, Psycho-Path, Dekadent (black metal) and Buldožer (progressive rock), and most recently Perpetuum Jazzile with more than 12 million views combined for the two a cappella "Africa" performance videos since their publishing on YouTube in May 2009 until September 2011, earning them kudos from the song's co-writer, David Paich.

==== Singer-songwriters ====
Slovenian post-WWII singer-songwriters include Frane Milčinski (1914–1988), Tomaž Pengov whose 1973 album Odpotovanja is considered to be the first singer-songwriter album in former Yugoslavia, Tomaž Domicelj, Marko Brecelj, Andrej Šifrer, Eva Sršen, Neca Falk, and Jani Kovačič. After 1990, Adi Smolar, Iztok Mlakar, Vita Mavrič, Vlado Kreslin, Zoran Predin, Peter Lovšin, and Magnifico have been popular in Slovenia, as well.

==== World music ====
In the 1970s, Bratko Bibič's band Begnagrad is considered one of the direct influences on modern world music. Bibič's unique accordion style, often solo, with no accompaniment, has also made him a solo star.

==== Punk rock ====
Slovenia was the center for punk rock in Titoist Yugoslavia. The most famous representatives of this genre were Pankrti, Niet, Lublanski Psi, Čao Pičke, Via Ofenziva, Tožibabe, and Otroci Socializma.

==== Techno and tech-house ====
Slovenia has also produced two renowned DJs: DJ Umek and Valentino Kanzyani. Specialising in a frantic brand of party techno and tech-house, the pair co-founded the label Recycled Loops as well as having many releases on labels such as Novamute, Primate, Intec, and Bassethound Records.

== Theatre ==
Slovenia has a strong tradition of live theatre. Both professional and amateur theatre are financially supported by the government. Professional theatre in Slovenia runs in a repertory system; the majority of professional theatres employ an ensemble of actors, and produce a season with four to twelve plays. The plays stay on repertory for a minimum of one season, but often, shows continue playing for a few years. There are four national theatres in Slovenia: Slovene National Theatre, Ljubljana, and Maribor National Drama Theatre, Slovene National Opera in Ljubljana and Slovene National Theatre in Nova Gorica. In addition, there are other nationally funded repertory theatres Mestno Gledalisce Ljubljansko (City Theatre Ljubljana), Mladinsko Gledalisce Ljubljana, Presernovo gledalisce Kranj, Slovensko Ljudsko Gledalisce Celje, Mestno gledalisce Ptuj, Anton Podbevsek Teater Novo Mesto, Gledalisce Koper, Gledalisce Glej, and Mini Teater. Lastly, Slovenia also has two national repertory theatres dedicated to producing puppetry; Lutkovno gledalisce Ljubljana and Lutkovno gledalisce Maribor.

Independent, small producers are also active in Slovenia, including physical theatre (e.g., Betontanc), street theatre (e.g., Ana Monró Theatre), theatre sports championship Impro League, and improvisational theatre (e.g., IGLU Theatre).

=== History ===
First theatrical performances in Slovenia date all the way back to the 18th century. Between 1715 and 1727, Passion procession play was performed in the town of Skofja Loka. However, the first play written and performed in Slovene is Županova Micka by Anton Tomaž Linhart, which premiered on 28 December 1789. The play was very influential in the formation of national cultural and linguistic identity. Slovenia at the time was not a sovereign country, and Slovene was not recognized as a language. The majority of literary works and business transactions were conducted in German, and Slovene playwriting, as well as discussions regarding the nature of Slovene identity, were closely connected with the formation of theatre. In 1879 a Dramatic Society was formed in Ljubljana as a formal attempt to professionalize and institutionalize theatre and playwriting in Slovenia. Between 1879 and 1941, there are several initiatives leading towards the professionalization of Slovene theatre; the first theatre venue is opened in Ljubljana before the end of 19.century, and the Drama Society operates as a kind of three-pronged organization under one umbrella. There are research and international dialogue forming a sort of institute-like branch, there is an early drama school educating performers, and a repertory theatre with a year-long full season. Between 1920 and 1941, the government tries to suppress the theatre, which springs back to life after 1941, when Slovenia joins Yugoslavia. In 1952 additional seven professional repertory theatres are founded by the national government and large municipalities who both provide ongoing long-term funding. The late 50's, 60's and 70's mark the time of a new wave of experimental, independent theatre in Slovenia.

== Visual arts, architecture and design ==
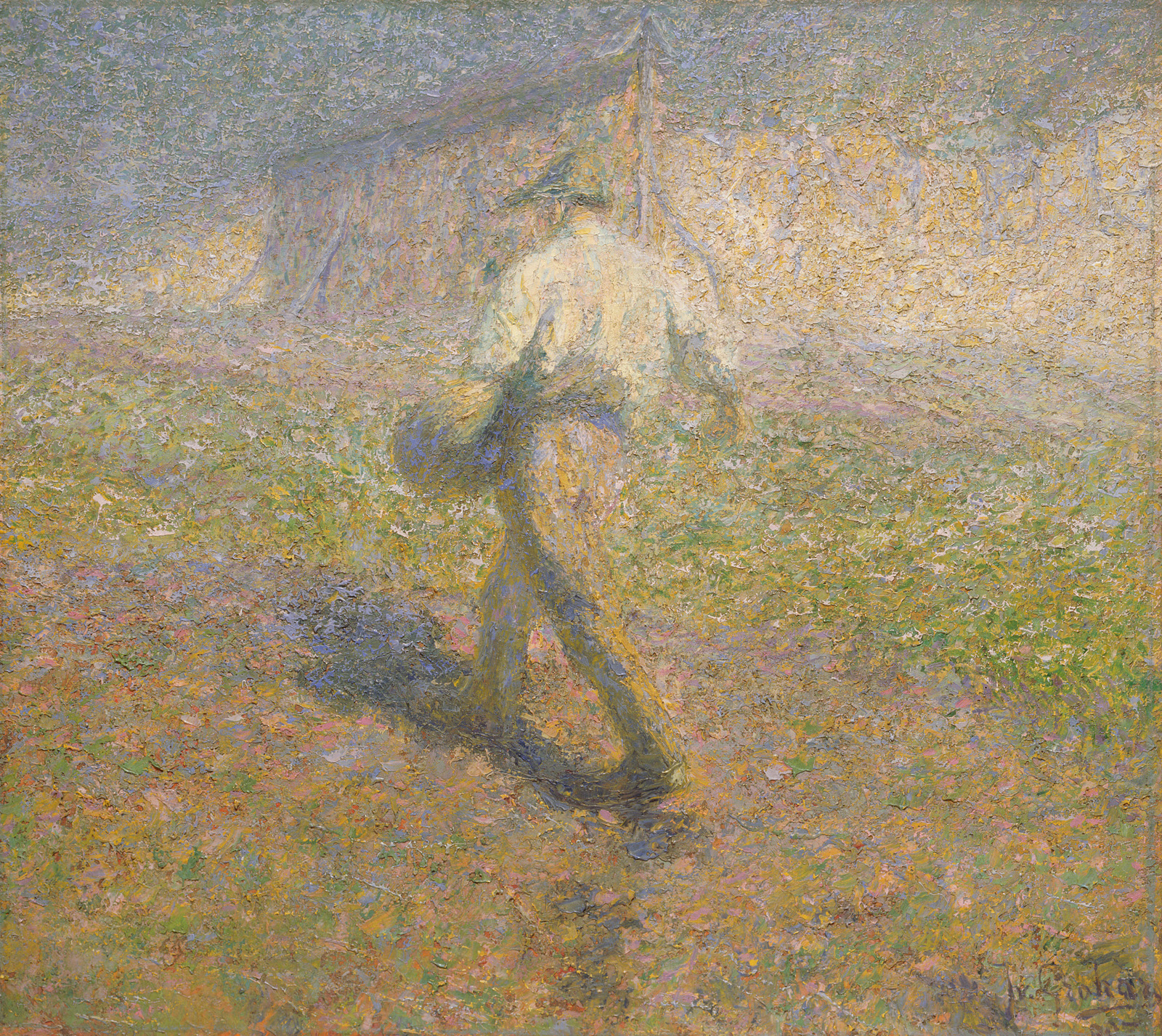
The Sower (1907), by the Impressionist painter and musician Ivan Grohar, became a metaphor for the Slovenes and was a reflection of the transition from a rural to an urban culture.

Slovenia's visual arts, architecture, and design are shaped by a number of architects, designers, painters, sculptors, photographers, graphics artists, as well as comics, illustration, and conceptual artists. The most prestigious institutions exhibiting works of Slovene visual artists are the National Gallery of Slovenia and the Museum of Modern Art.

=== Architecture ===
Slovenia, like most of Central Europe, boasts architectural styles from many periods and styles, specifically those connected to Austrian, Venetian and Hungarian historical states. Modern architecture in Slovenia was introduced by Max Fabiani, and in the mid-war period further by Jože Plečnik, whose works in Slovene capital Ljubljana received UNESCO recognition and shaped towns even outside of Slovenia, and Ivan Vurnik. In the second half of the 20th century, the national and universal styles were merged by the architects Edvard Ravnikar and Marko Mušič.

=== Comics and animation ===
Milko Bambič is known for the first Slovene comic strip Little Negro Bu-ci-bu, an allegory of Mussolini's career, and as the creator of the Three Hearts (Tri srca) brand, still used today by Radenska. After WW II, both the comics and animated advertisements drawn by Miki Muster gained popularity in Slovenia.

Animation

The first Slovenian animated feature film was the 1998 Socialization of a Bull, made by Zvonko Čoh and Milan Erič who together drew fifty thousand frames during the ten years of its making. The first entirely computer made animations are the 2003 Perkmandeljc and the 2008 Čikorja an' kafe, both made by Dušan Kastelic.

=== Conceptual art ===
A number of conceptual visual art groups were formed, including OHO, Group 69, and IRWIN. Nowadays, the Slovene visual arts are diverse, based on tradition, reflect the influence of neighbouring nations, and are intertwined with modern European movements.

=== Design ===
The most known among Slovene interior designers is the designer of Scandinavian design-inspired 1952 Rex chair, Niko Kralj. His design is included in the collection of the Museum of Modern Art MOMA in New York City.

Elan SCX is one of the best industrial design items that changed the world ski industry. They were designed by the internationally known Slovenian Elan company. Elan skis were depicted, even before Elan SCX, in the 1985 James Bond, film series part A View to a Kill with Roger Moore. In the romantic comedy film Working Girl, Katharine Parker (Sigourney Weaver) was depicted as skiing on the RC ELAN model skis and poles.

=== Graphics ===
During World War II, numerous graphics were created by Božidar Jakac, who helped establish the post-war Academy of Visual Arts in Ljubljana.

=== Illustration ===
In 1917 Hinko Smrekar illustrated the notable Fran Levstik's Martin Krpan book about the Slovene folk hero. The children's books illustrators include a number of women illustrators, such as Marlenka Stupica, Marija Lucija Stupica, Ančka Gošnik Godec, Marjanca Jemec Božič, and Jelka Reichman.

Many generations of children have been educated by the technical and science illustrations created by Božo Kos and published in Slovenian children's magazines, such as Ciciban.

Recently, Lila Prap's illustrations gained popularity in Japan, where children's cartoons based on her illustrations have been televised.

=== Painting ===
Historically, painting and sculpture in Slovenia were in the late 18th and the 19th century marked by Neoclassicism (Matevž Langus), Biedermeier (Giuseppe Tominz), and Romanticism (Michael Stroy). The first art exhibition in Slovenia was organized in the late 19th century by Ivana Kobilca, a woman-painter who worked in the realistic tradition. Impressionist artists include Matej Sternen, Matija Jama, Rihard Jakopič, Ivan Grohar, whose The Sower (Slovene: Sejalec) was depicted on the €0.05 Slovenian euro coins, and Franc Berneker, who introduced impressionism to Slovenia. Espressionist painters include Veno Pilon and Tone Kralj, whose picture book, reprinted thirteen times, is now the most recognizable image of the folk hero Martin Krpan.

=== Photography ===
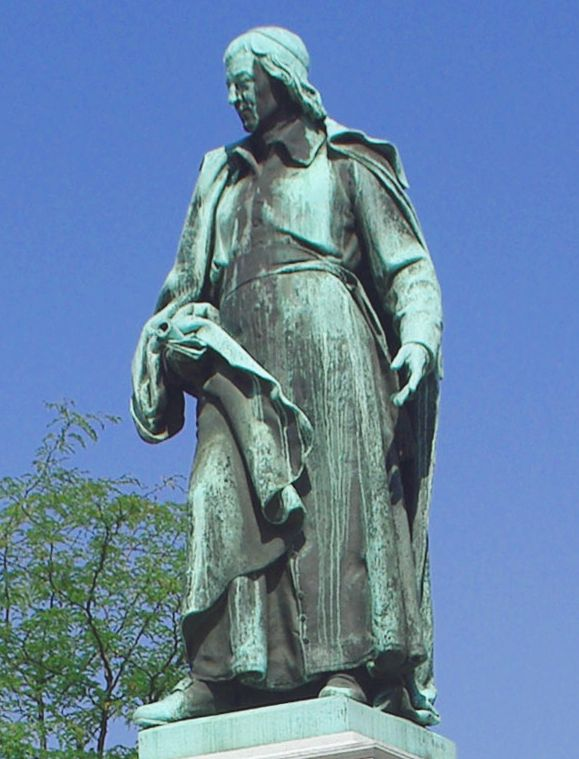
The sculpture of the poet Valentin Vodnik (1758–1819) was created by Alojz Gangl in 1889 as part of Vodnik Monument, the first Slovene national monument.

In 1841, Janez Puhar (1814–1864) invented a process for photography on glass, recognized on 17 June 1852 in Paris by the Académie Nationale Agricole, Manufacturière et Commerciale. Gojmir Anton Kos was a notable realist painter and photographer between First World War and WW II.

The first photographer from Slovenia whose work was published by National Geographic magazine is Arne Hodalič

=== Sculpture ===
The renewal of Slovene sculpture begun with Alojz Gangl (1859–1935), who made the first public monument of the notable Enlightenment figure Valentin Vodnik and provided The Genius of the Theatre and other statues for the Slovenian National Opera and Ballet Theatre building.

== See also ==
- List of libraries in Slovenia
- Public holidays in Slovenia
