= Music of Slovenia =

In the minds of many foreigners, Slovenian folk music means a form of polka that is still popular today, especially among expatriates and their descendants. However, there are many styles of Slovenian folk music beyond polka and waltz. Kolo, lender, štajeriš, mafrine and šaltin are a few of the traditional music styles and dances.

== Prehistory ==
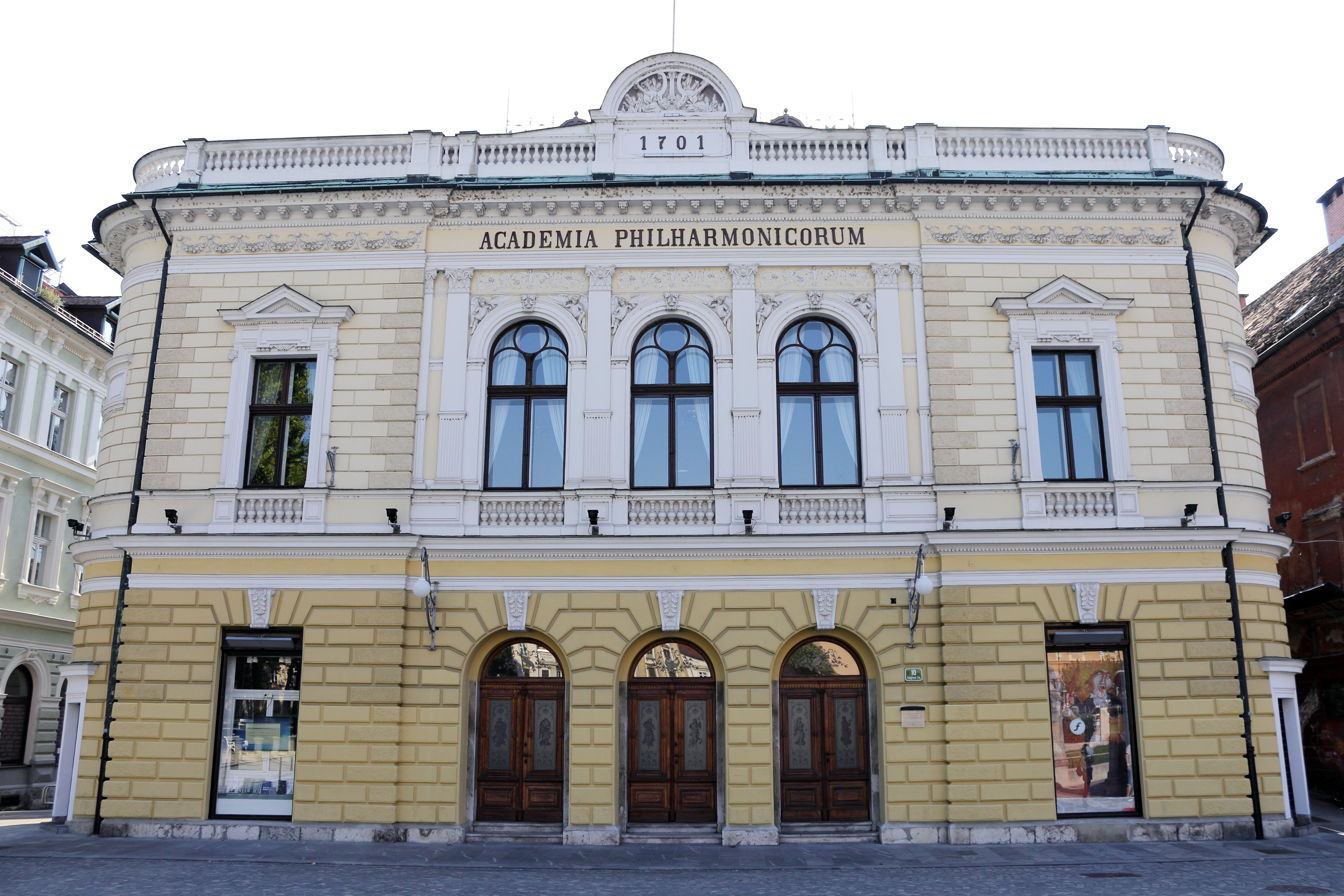
Philharmonic Hall, the main building of the Slovene Philharmonic Orchestra, at Congress Square in Ljubljana.

The Divje Babe flute, a perforated bone found in a cave at the Divje Babe site Cerkno, Slovenia. It is controversially believed to be a flute, which makes it possibly the oldest known musical instrument ever. Its age is estimated at approximately 55,000 years.

The history of modern Slovenian music can be traced back to the 5th century, when Christianity spread in Carantania. Liturgical hymns (kyrie Eleison) were introduced, and became the first plainchant to make a connection to the peoples' language.

== Classical music ==
=== Medieval ===
During the medieval era, secular music was as popular as church music, including wandering minnesingers.

George Slatkonia, a Carniolan conductor and composer from Novo Mesto, became the director of the Vienna Boys' Choir in 1498.

=== Renaissance ===
By the time of Protestant Reformation in the 16th century, music was used to proselytize in Carniola. The first Slovenian hymnal, Eni Psalmi, was published in 1567. This period saw the rise of Renaissance musicians like Jacobus Gallus. Italy was an important musical influence of the period, especially in sacred music, such as that of Antonio Tarsia (composer) of Koper, in oratorio and opera. A Commedia was performed in Ljubljana in 1660, and an opera in 1700 in the family palace of the Auersperg family.

=== Enlightenment ===
In 1701, Johann Berthold von Höffer (1667–1718), a nobleman and amateur composer from Ljubljana, founded the Academia Philharmonicorum Labacensis based on Italian models. and the Ljubljana branch of the Roman Academy of Arcadia was founded a few years later in 1709. Apart from Höffer, the Cathedral provost Michael Omerza was also noted for his oratorios. The first major Slovenian opera was performed in 1732, Il Tamerlano by abbate Giuseppe Clemente de Bonomi, maestro di Capella, in the palace of the Carniolan vice-regent, the duke Francesco Antonio Sigifrid Della Torre e Valassina.

Beginning in 1768, German theatre companies arrived and became very popular. The 1794 formation of the Philharmonische Gesellschaft was important because it was one of the first such orchestras in Central Europe.

=== 19th century ===
The 19th century saw the growth of a distinctively Slovenian classical music sound based on romanticism, while the German minority continued to push for a stronger Germanic identity. The Ljubljana opera house (1892) was shared by Slovene and German opera companies.

Composers of Slovenian Lieder and art songs include Emil Adamič (1877–1936), Fran Gerbič (1840–1917), Alojz Geržinič (1915–2008), Benjamin Ipavec (1829–1908), Davorin Jenko (1835–1914), Anton Lajovic (1878–1960), Kamilo Mašek (1831–1859), Josip Pavčič (1870–1949), Zorko Prelovec (1887–1939), and Lucijan Marija Škerjanc (1900–1973). Some like Fran Gerbič (1840–1917), Eliza Frančiška Grizold (1847–1913),... also composed sacred music.

=== 20th century ===
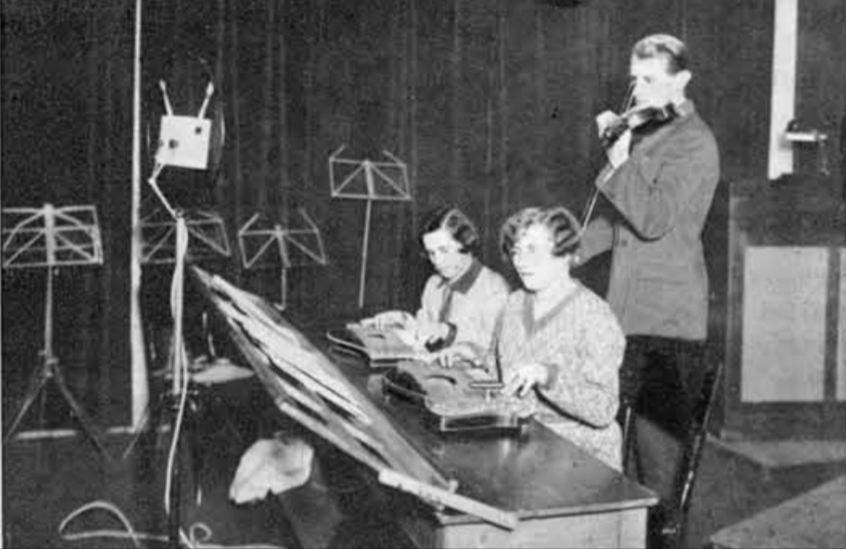
Slovenian composer and zither player Dragica Legat Košmerl (centre) performing with a trio on Radio Ljubljana in 1929.

In the early 20th century, impressionism was spreading across Slovenia, which soon produced composers Marij Kogoj and Slavko Osterc.

The most important Slovenian 20th-crntury zitherist and zither teacher was composer Dragica Legat Košmerl.

Avant-garde classical music arose in Slovenia in the 1960s, largely due to the work of Uroš Krek, Dane Škerl, Primož Ramovš and Ivo Petrić, who also conducted the Slavko Osterc Ensemble. Jakob Jež, Darijan Božič, Lojze Lebič and Vinko Globokar have since composed enduring works, especially Globokar's L'Armonia, an opera. In the 1950s, Božidar Kantušer was the most progressive of all, by dint of his atonality.

=== Contemporary ===
Contemporary classic music composers include Uroš Rojko, Tomaž Svete, Brina Jež-Brezavšček and Aldo Kumar.

== Opera ==
The Slovenian National Theatres in Maribor and Ljubljana serve as the national opera and ballet houses. Mezzo-soprano Marjana Lipovšek was born in Ljubljana. Opera composers from Slovenia include Fran Gerbič, Jani Golob, Slavko Osterc, Pavel Šivic and Igor Štuhec.

== Film music ==
The composer of film scores for 170 films was Bojan Adamič (1912–1995).

== Folk music ==
=== Vocal ===
Rural harmony singing is a deep rooted tradition in Slovenia, and is at least three-part singing (four voices), while in some regions even up to eight-part singing (nine voices). Slovenian folk songs, thus, usually resounds soft and harmonious, and are very seldom in minor. Famous Slovenian folk singers were Ana Ažbe, Katarina Zupančič - Žičkova Katra, Minca Krkovič,... Some Slovenian folk composers were Anka Salmič,...

=== Instrumental ===
Typical Slovenian folk music is performed on Styrian harmonica (the oldest type of accordion), fiddle, clarinet, zithers, flute, and by brass bands of alpine type. In eastern Slovenia, fiddle and cimbalon bands are called velike goslarije. Traditional Slovenian music include various kinds of musical instruments such as:

- Steirische Harmonika
- Kontra
- Hammered dulcimer
- Cimbalon grande
- Drone zither
- Violin zither
- Zither
- Tamburica
- Fiddle
- Carnian fiddle
- Cello
- Brunkula cello
- Gaida
- Brass instruments, such as baritone horn
- Clarinet
- Jaw harp
- Clay pot bass
- Okarina
- Akelêmb
- Klopotec
- Panpipes
- Wooden cross flutes of various sizes
- Psaltery
- Tambourine

Folk music revivalists include Volk Volk, Kurja Koža, Marko Banda, Katice, Bogdana Herman, Ljoba Jenče, Vruja, Trinajsto praše, Šavrinske pupe en ragacone, Musicante Istriani, and Tolovaj Mataj.

One of the best Slovenian diatonic accordionists is Nejc Pačnik who won the accordion world-championship twice, in 2009 and 2015.

=== Slovenian pop-folk music ===
From 1952 on, the Slavko Avsenik's band began to appear in broadcasts, movies, and concerts all over the West Germany, inventing the original "Oberkrainer" sound that has become the primary vehicle of ethnic musical expression not only in Slovenia, but also in Germany, Austria, Switzerland, and in the Benelux, spawning hundreds of Alpine orchestras in the process. The band produced nearly 1000 original compositions, an integral part of the Slovenian-style polka legacy. Avsenik's most popular instrumental composition is the polka that is titled "Na Golici" (in Slovene), or "Trompetenecho" (in German), and "Trumpet Echoes" (in English). Oberkrainer music, which the Avsenik Ensemble popularized, is always a strong candidate for pop-folk music awards in Slovenia and Austria. Slavko and his brother, Vilko, are usually credited as the pioneers of Slovenian folk music, having solidified its style in the 1950s.

Many musicians followed Avsenik's steps, one of the most famous being Lojze Slak.

== Eurovision Song Contest ==
Slovenia has taken part in the Eurovision Song Contest 31 times since 1993, only not participating in 1994 and 2000. They previously participated as part of Yugoslavia. Their best results were 7th in 1995 with the song "Prisluhni mi" by Darja Švajger, and 7th in 2001 with the song "Energy" by Nuša Derenda. Since the introduction of semi-finals at Eurovision, they have failed to qualify just 13 times. All of Slovenia's Eurovision entrants and songs have been decided through the national final EMA, except for their 2023 and 2024 entries which were decided by an internal selection. In 2023 and 2024, Slovenia was represented by Joker Out and Raiven respectively, both artists having qualified and placed 21st and 23rd in the Grand Final.

== Slovenian song festival ==
A similarly high standing in Slovene culture, like the Sanremo Music Festival has had in Italian culture, was attributed to the coastal Melodies of Sea and Sun (In Slovene: Melodije morja in sonca) and Slovenian song festival (In Slovene: Slovenska popevka), dedicated to a specific genre of popular Slovene music.

== Popular music ==
=== Contemporary music ===
Among pop, rock, industrial, and indie musicians the most popular in Slovenia include Laibach, an early 1980s industrial music group, and most recently the Slovenian pop a cappella band Perpetuum Jazzile.

==== Pop, rock, metal, and indie music ====
Other popular bands, most largely unknown outside the country, include Tabu, ManuElla, Društvo Mrtvih Pesnikov (pop-rock), Siddharta, Rok 'n' Band, Pop Design, Fredi Miler, Terrafolk, Leaf Fat (screamo), Amaya, Šank Rock, Big Foot Mama, Yogurt, Dan D, Zablujena generacija, Katalena, Devil Doll (experimental rock), Negligence (band), Chateau, Čuki, Zaklonišče Prepeva, Psycho-Path, Dekadent (black metal), Buldožer (progressive rock) and Joker Out. The deathcore band Within Destruction have released two-full-length albums and have partaken in several European tours; the band is based in Jesenice.

==== Singer-songwriters ====
Slovenian post-WWII singer-songwriters include Frane Milčinski (1914–1988), Tomaž Pengov whose 1973 album Odpotovanja is considered to be the first singer-songwriter album in former Yugoslavia, Tomaž Domicelj, Marko Brecelj, Andrej Šifrer, Eva Sršen, Neca Falk, and Jani Kovačič. After 1990, Adi Smolar, Iztok Mlakar, Vita Mavrič, Vlado Kreslin, Zoran Predin, Peter Lovšin, and Magnifico have been popular in Slovenia, as well.

==== World music ====
The 1970s Bratko Bibič's band Begnagrad is considered one of the direct influences on modern world music. Bibič's unique accordion style, often solo, with no accompaniment, has also made him a solo star.

==== Punk rock ====
Slovenia was the center for punk rock in the Titoist Yugoslavia. The most famous representatives of this genre were Pankrti, Niet, Lublanski Psi, Kuzle, Čao Pičke, Via Ofenziva, Tožibabe, and Otroci Socializma.

==== Techno and tech-house ====
Slovenia has also produced two renowned DJs: DJ Umek and Valentino Kanzyani. The pair, who specialise in blending party techno and tech-house, co-founded the label Recycled Loops. They additionally have multiple releases on labels such as Novamute, Primate, Intec and Bassethound Records.

==== Neue Slowenische Kunst ====
Neue Slowenische Kunst (a German phrase meaning "New Slovenian Art"), aka NSK, is a controversial political art collective that announced itself in Slovenia in 1984, when Slovenia was part of Yugoslavia. NSK's name, being German, is compatible with a theme in NSK works: the complicated relationship Slovenes have had with Germans. The name of NSK's music wing, Laibach, is also the German name of the Slovene capital Ljubljana, creating controversy through evoking memories of the Nazi occupation of Slovenia during the Second World War.

===== Composition =====
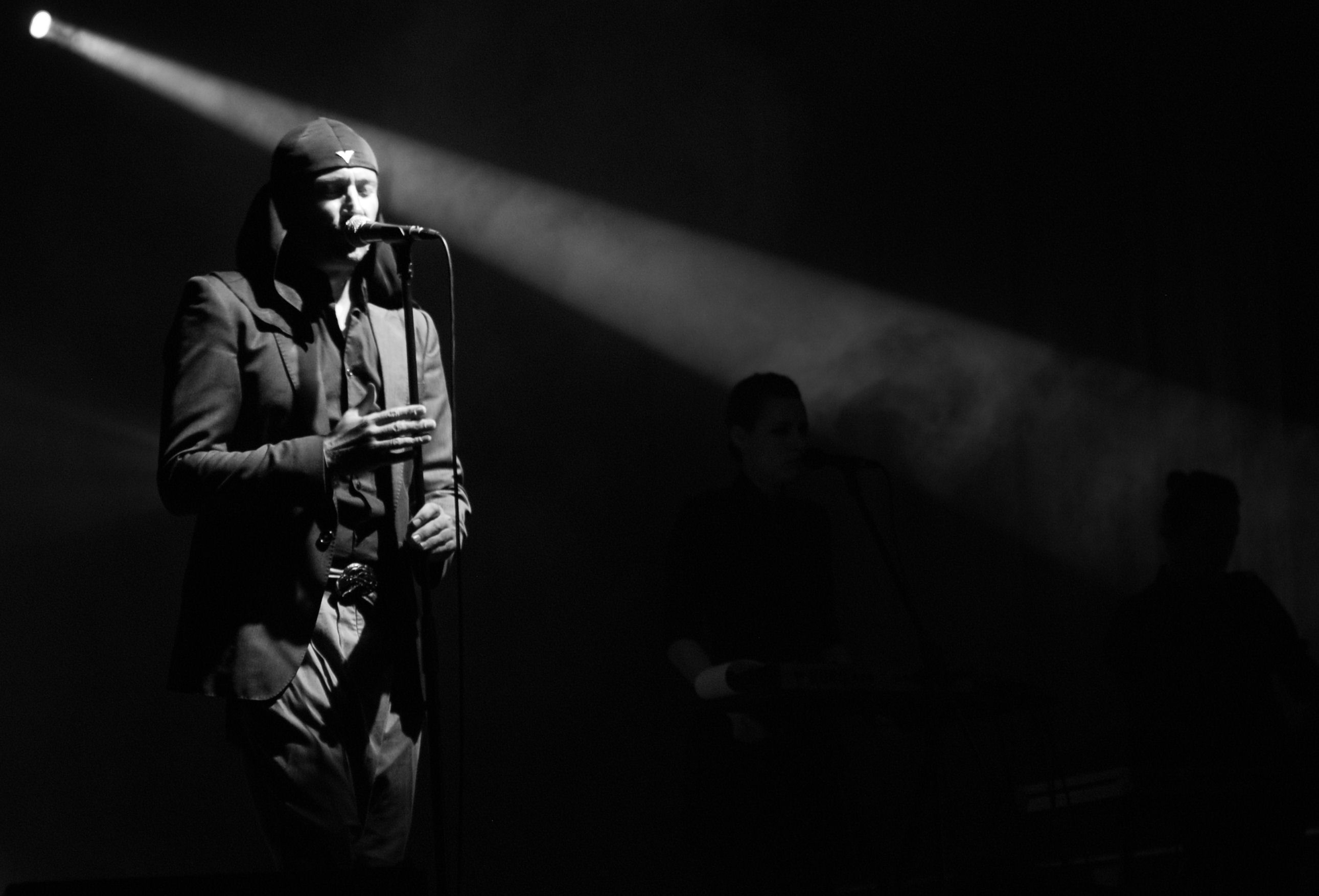
Laibach performing at wRacku Festiwal 2010

NSK's best-known member is the musical group Laibach. Other NSK member groups include IRWIN (visual art), Noordung (theater; originally named Scipion Nasice Sisters Theatre, also known as Red Pilot), New Collective Studio (graphics; also known as New Collectivism), Retrovision (film and video), and the Department of Pure and Applied Philosophy (theory). The founding groups of the NSK were Laibach, IRWIN, and Scipion Našice Sisters Theater.

===== Characteristics =====
NSK art often draws on symbols drawn from totalitarian or extreme nationalist movements, often reappropriating totalitarian kitsch in a visual style reminiscent of Dada. NSK artists often juxtapose symbols from different (and often incompatible) political ideologies. For example, a 1987 NSK-designed poster caused a scandal by winning a competition for the Yugoslavian Youth Day Celebration. The poster appropriated a painting by Nazi artist Richard Klein, replacing the flag of Nazi Germany with the Yugoslav flag and the German eagle with a dove.

Both IRWIN and Laibach are emphatic about their work being collective rather than individual. Laibach's original songs and arrangements are always credited to the group collectively; the individual artists are not named on their album covers; at one point, there were even two separate Laibach groups touring at the same time, both with members of the original group. Similarly, the IRWIN artists never sign their work individually; instead, they are "signed" with a stamp or certificate indicating approval as a work from the IRWIN collective.

The NSK were the subject of a 1996 documentary film written and directed by Michael Benson, entitled Prerokbe Ognja in Slovenian, or Predictions of Fire in English. Among those interviewed in the film is Slovenian intellectual Slavoj Žižek.

===== NSK State =====
Since 1991, NSK has claimed to constitute a state, a claim similar to that of micronations. They issue passports, have presented shows of their work in the guise of an embassy or even as a territory of their supposed state, and maintain consulates in several cities including Umag, Croatia. NSK have also issued postage stamps. Laibach, in 2006, recorded (some may say 'remixed') the NSK State National Anthem on the LP "Volk." The "anthem" adopts its melody from another Laibach song, "The Great Seal." Laibach's version of the NSK anthem includes a computer voice reciting an excerpt from Winston Churchill's famous "We shall fight them on the beaches/We shall never surrender" speech. The computer voice is clearly recognisable as the voice synthesiser Macintalk, built into classic Mac OS, and uses the preset voice Ralph.

The NSK passports are an art project and as such are not valid for travel. However, many desperate people have fallen for a scam in which they are issued a NSK passport. Most of these scams originate in Nigeria and Egypt.

===== Laibach =====
Laibach [ˈlaɪbax] is a Slovenian avant-garde music group strongly associated with martial, and neo-classical musical styles. Laibach formed 1 June 1980 in Trbovlje, Slovenia (then Yugoslavia). Laibach represents the music wing of the Neue Slowenische Kunst (NSK) art collective, of which it was a founding member in 1984. The name "Laibach" is the German name for Slovenia's capital city, Ljubljana.

== See also ==
- Drone zither – type of Slovenian zither
- Klopotec – a type of a scarecrow used as a folk instrument
- List of radio stations in Slovenia
- List of Slovenian musicians
- Slovenian rock
- Slovenian-style polka
