= Rock music in Slovenia =

Slovenian musical scene

- Other names: Slovenian rock
- Stylistic origins: Rock music Rock and roll music
- Cultural origins: Slovenia in the Late 1950s

Rock and roll is a musical genre from the United States, popularized worldwide beginning in the 1950s. Though rock had become popular earlier, it was not until the mid-1980s breakthrough of Laibach, who are now internationally renowned, that Slovenian rock became well known. Other well-known Slovenian rock bands include Hic et Nunc, whose 1998 tour of the United States brought even more international attention to Slovenian rock.

In Yugoslavia, Slovenia was the center for punk rock. The best-known representatives of this genre were Pankrti, Niet, Lublanski Psi, Čao Pičke, Via Ofenziva, Tožibabe, and Otroci Socializma.

Popular rock artists, largely unknown outside the country, are: Lačni Franz (Zoran Predin), Šank Rock, Big Foot Mama, Zaklonišče Prepeva, Siddharta, Vlado Kreslin, Niet, Mi2, Buldožer, Carpe Diem, Dan D, Društvo mrtvih pesnikov, Elvis Jackson (ska punk), Orlek, Avtomobili, Pink Panker, Joker Out and others.

Slovenian neofolk/martial industrial band Laibach are also sometimes mentioned as the most known Slovenian "rock" band.

== See also ==
- Popular music in the Socialist Federal Republic of Yugoslavia
- New wave music in Yugoslavia
- Punk rock in Yugoslavia
