= Osterc =

Osterc is a Slovenian surname that may refer to

- Aljaž Osterc (born 1999), Slovenian ski jumper
- Lidija Osterc (1928–2006), Slovenian painter and illustrator
- Milan Osterc (born 1975), Slovenian football striker
- Slavko Osterc (1895–1941), Slovenian composer
  - Slavko Osterc Ensemble, a Slovenian chamber orchestra formed in 1962
