= Marprom =

Bus operator in Maribor, Slovenia

Javno podjetje za mestni potniški promet Marprom d.o.o.
- Headquarters: Mlinska ulica 1, 2000 Maribor, Slovenija
- Services: Public transportation
- Website: www.marprom.si

Marprom is a municipally owned public transport operator that operates 17 local bus services in the city of Maribor, Slovenia. Service 16 is operated on behalf of the Municipality of Duplek.

== Overview ==
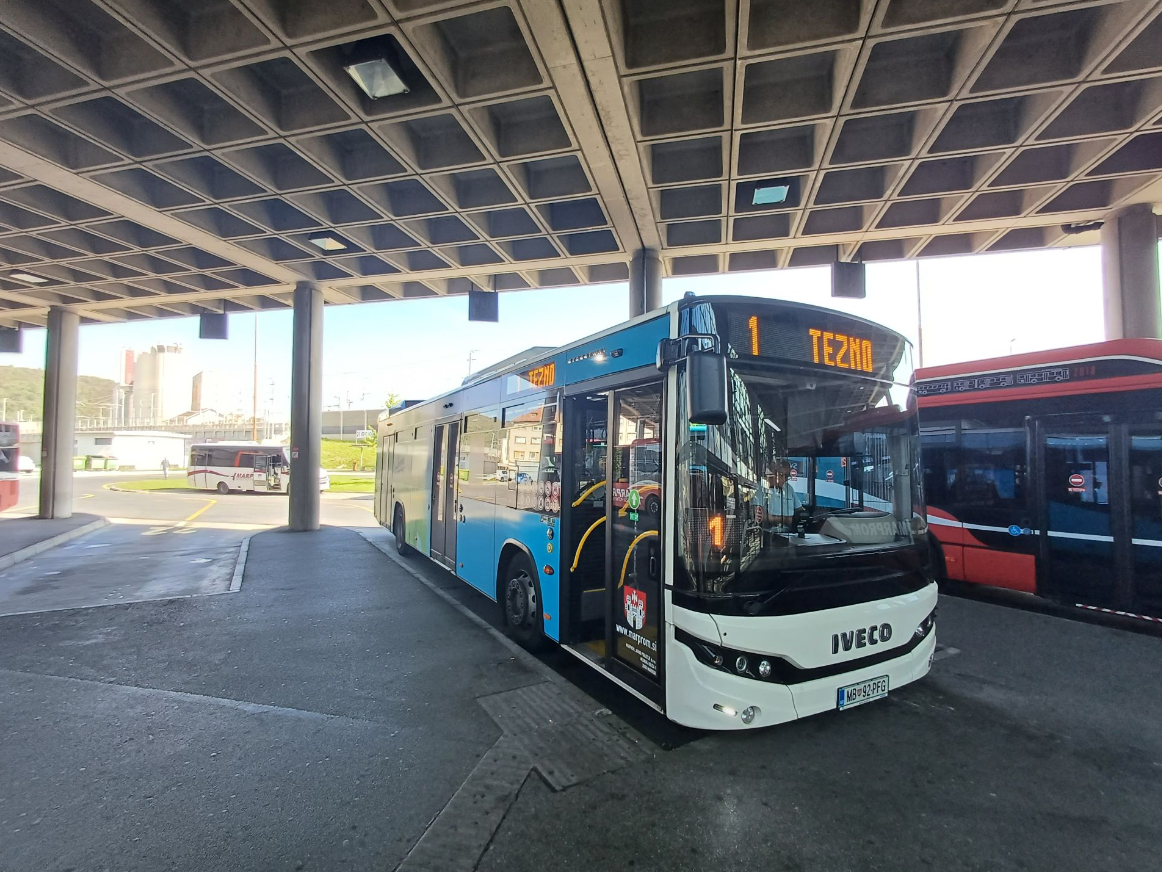
An IVECO e-Way at Maribor Bus Station

Marprom was founded on the 21st of June 2011 to provide better bus services for the people of Maribor. They run a variety of bus models, but some include:

- Mercedes-Benz Connecto
- IVECO Crossway
- IVECO e-Way
- SCANIA Citywide LF

== Bus Services ==
Marprom operates 17 bus services within Maribor. Alongside these local bus services, Marprom also run a service to Pohorje using a minibus with an attached bicycle trailer.

Marprom Bus Service List
Route Number	Start	Destination
1	Maribor Bus Station	Tezno
2	Betnavska Ulica	Razvanje
3	Mlinska Bus Station	Dobrava Cemetery
4	Limbuš	NC Supernova
6	Maribor Bus Station	Vzpenjača
7	Maribor Bus Station	Rošpoh via. Kamnica
8	Maribor Bus Station	Terme Fontana
9	Maribor Bus Station	Dogoše via. Zrkovci
12	Mlinska Bus Station	Pobrežje via. Gosposvetska
13	Maribor Bus Station	Tezno via. Črnogorska
15	Bresternica	Košaški Dol via. Maribor Railway Station
16	Maribor Bus Station	Zgornji Duplek
17	Ribniško Selo	Erjavčeva via. Maribor Bus Station
18	Gosposvetska	Pekre via. Lackova
19	Maribor Bus Station	Šarhova
20	Mlinska Bus Station	Grušova
21	Maribor Bus Station	Merkur via. Ljubljanska

During the Lent Festival, Marprom operate two specialised circular services.

Lent Festival Circular Services
Route Number	Start	Destination
K1	Maribor Bus Station	Tezno/Čufarjeva/Greenwich/Main Square
K2	Maribor Bus Station	Radvanjska/Lackova/Pekre/Ob ribniku/Limbuš/Studenci/Main Square

== Cablecars ==
Marprom operate a fleet of cablecars at Vzpenjača.

As part of a cablecar infrastructure overhaul in 2009, a number of brand new 8-seater cablecars were put into service. This replaced the previous infrastructure that dated back to the 1960s.

== See also ==
- Ljubljana Passenger Transport
