= Vodopivec =

Vodopivec is a Slovene surname. Notable people with the surname include:

- Frano Vodopivec (1924–1998), Croatian cinematographer
- Peter Vodopivec (born 1946), Slovene historian and intellectual
- Tin Vodopivec (born 1982), Slovene comedian
