= Tin Vodopivec =

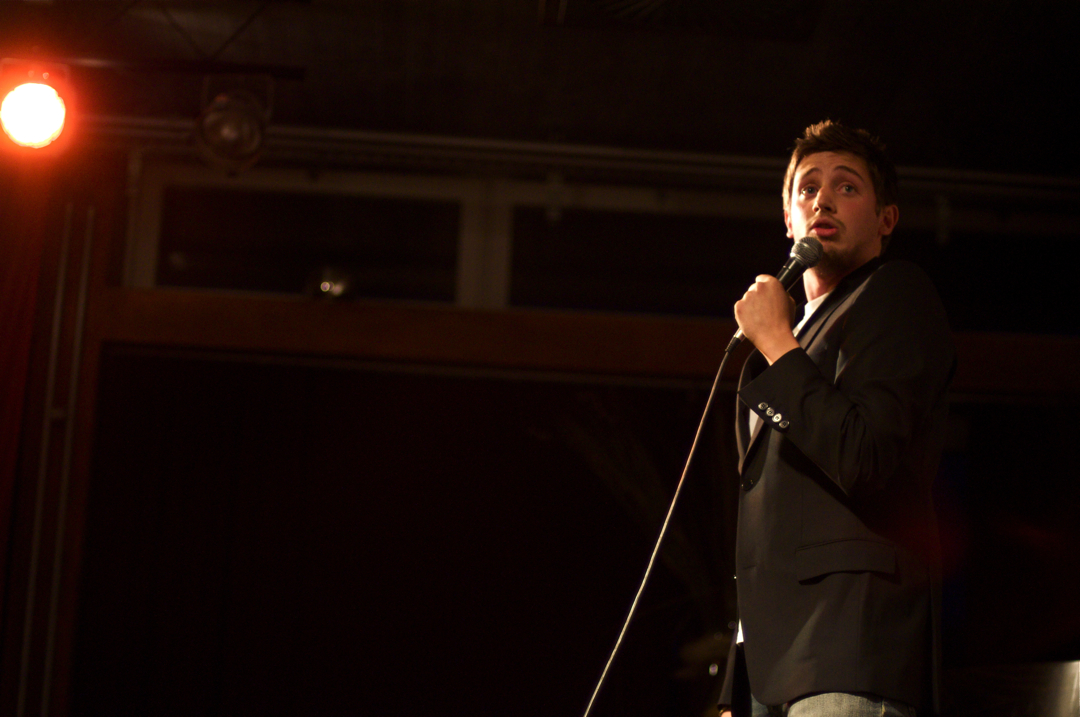
Vodopivec at the 2009 Carniola Festival

Tin Vodopivec is a stand-up comedian from Slovenia, notable as the co-founder of Ljubljana’s first stand-up comedy festival Punch. He made his international debut in February 2010 at the Leicester Comedy Festival. His observational humour is based on everyday life. In 2023

== Life ==
Tin graduated from law at the Faculty of Law of the University of Ljubljana.

== Work ==
He has been one of the pioneers of the new style of comedy which was at the time unknown in Slovenia. He had in two years more than 100 live performances, as well as an appearance on a Sunday afternoon family show on Slovene national RTV Slovenia television. In August 2008, he organized the first Punch festival, which was sold out all three nights.

In May 2008 he won the first Slovene comedy competition called Last comic standing and was announced as one of Slovene’s top comedians by Stop magazine. He was invited to all the Slovenian festivals, including Lent festival, Trnfest, ŠpasFest, Bujta Repa, Filofest, and the Slovene film festival. In September 2007, he was the first comedian to perform on a TV night show hosted by a controversial transvestite Marlenna, where he was re-invited later in December 2007. He performed as an opening act for the sold out concert of Latin singer Julio Iglesias. He worked as a producer, director, actor and co-writer of the talk show Gofla, which was a part of marketing campaign for the Slovene's largest mobile operator. He was also the face for the Telekom marketing campaign for the number 1188.

=== Film ===
Title	Year	Role	Notes
Nekaj sladkega	2023	Police officer	
Milice 2	2017	Guest at the party	
Glavom kroz zid	2016	Tin	
Tu pa tam	2004	Guy in Casino	

== Sources ==
- In the service of Stand up comedy, Mladina, 2008.
- Interview on Siol
- Tin Vodopivec on IMDB
