= Terrafolk =

Slovenian folk band

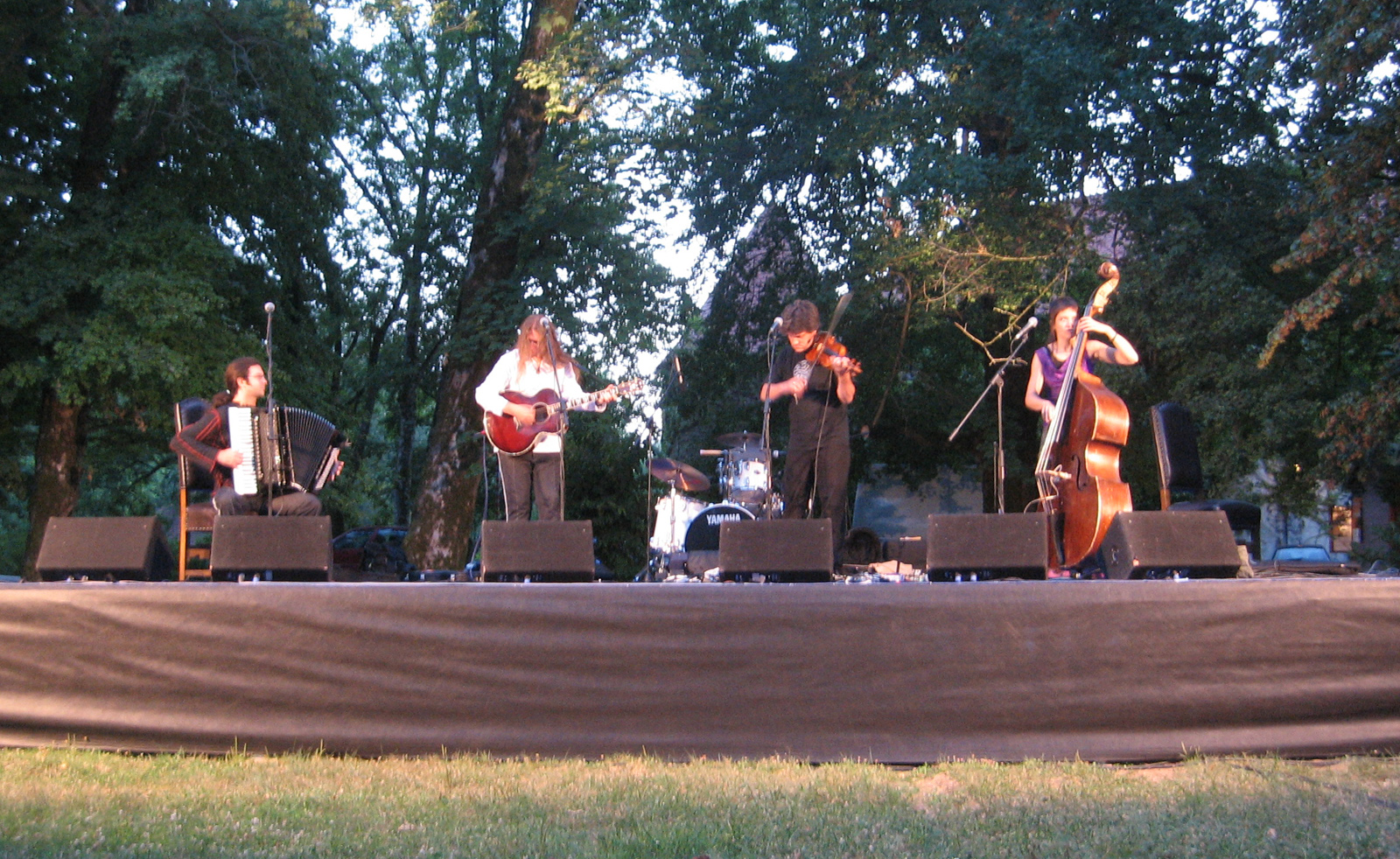
Terrafolk in concert (2007)

Terrafolk is a Slovenian folk band, formed in 1999 at Festival Lent in Slovenia. They quickly rose to fame, performing at numerous festivals throughout Europe, including the Edinburgh Fringe and Glastonbury, and winning the BBC World Music Audience Award in 2003. In 2004 the band played at the Snape Proms. In 2017 the group performed at the FolkEast-Festival in Suffolk.

Although their music is rooted in folk, they draw on a huge range of musical styles ranging from classical to jazz and alternative rock. They are also known for their sense of humour, performing songs such as "You Are My Sunshine" on the mandolin in the style of a death metal band, or playing on the top of 4m high 'pods', surrounded by fireworks in The World Famous Full Circle.
