= Slovene book fair =

Annual trade fair in Ljubljana, Slovenia

The Slovene book fair and festival is a traditional Slovenian trade fair and festival – held in Ljubljana, Slovenia – for the books that have been written in the Slovene language and published in the previous year.

== Operations ==
It is held each year at Ljubljana's Exhibition and Convention Centre and organised by the Association of Book Publishers of Slovenia. After the early years, the fair was held in Ljubljana's Cankar Centre, but returned to the Exhibition and Convention Centre in 2022 due to the lack of space.

The participating publishing houses are mainly from Slovenia, however, some of them are serving the Slovene minorities in Italy, Austria, and elsewhere.

The event includes presentations of new books, exhibitions, a training programme, debates, presentations for schools, and shows for children. It is the largest fair of its kind in Slovenia, each year attracting around one hundred publishing houses and thousands of visitors.

=== Awards ===
At the event, the association also bestows the Best First Book Award, the Best Book Design Award and the Schwentner Award for outstanding publishing achievements. The Publishing Academy features discussion and debate on current issues affecting the books and publishing sector.

== See also ==
- List of literary festivals
- Slovene literature
- Literature of Slovenia
