= Lent Festival =

Coordinates: 46°33′22.81″N 15°38′55.88″E

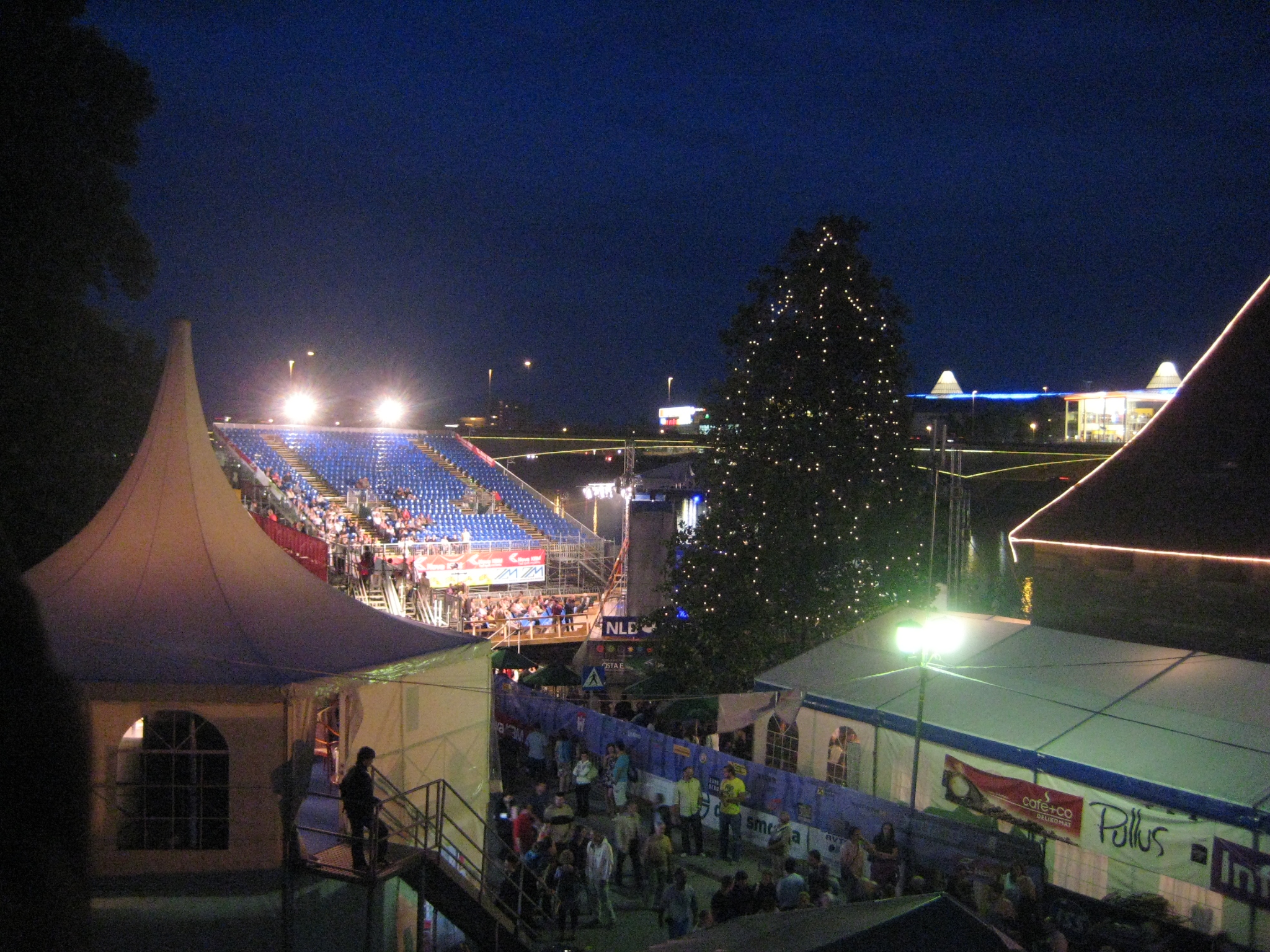
Lent Festival

The Lent International Summer Festival is a major arts festival held for approximately two weeks at the end of June annually in Maribor, Slovenia. Organized by the Narodni dom Cultural Center every year the festival attracts theatre, opera, ballet performers, classical, modern, and jazz musicians and dancers from all over the world as well as visitors. There are also mimes, magicians, and acrobats performing during the festival.

There are several sub festivals including the Otroški Lent (Children's Lent) which is organized to cater for the interests of children and the Lent International Jazz Festival which has attracted some of the world's most famous names including Ray Charles, B.B. King and Jose Feliciano, violinists such as Stéphane Grappelli and noted Slovene performers such as Vlado Kreslin and Zoran Predin.
