= Rex (chair) =

Slovenian design wood art chair made since 1952

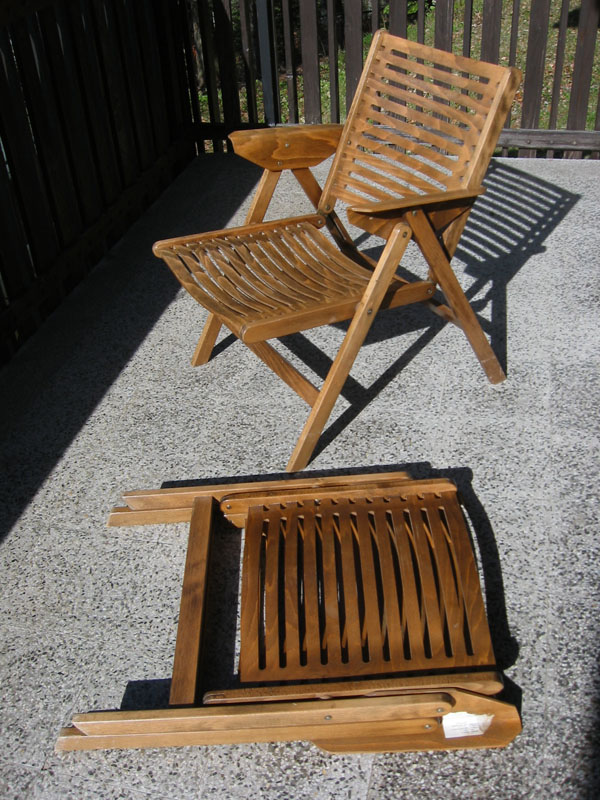
Rex Chair

The Rex Chair is a wooden chair designed by Slovene architect and designer Niko Kralj (1920–2013). It is part of the collection at the Museum of Modern Art (MoMA) in New York City. Kralj was awarded the Prešeren Prize for the Rex chair. In 2012, it was given a permanent place in the Designmuseum Denmark, the largest museum of design in Scandinavia. The Rex Chair was ranked as the second most significant Slovenian product of the 20th century by the "Finance" newspaper in 1999. The Museum of Modern Art in Ljubljana devoted an exhibit to the Rex chair in 2004 for its 50th anniversary.

== Development ==
Niko Kralj was manager of Stol development services when the chair was first introduced. It was the first chair in Slovenia made with the technology of molded, perforated plywood designed for mass production.

=== Basic designs ===
The back of this chair is slatted to allow for ventilation and to reduce weight. Bent plywood armrests support the elbows, and the back panel joints strengthen the chair's structure. Basic designs of the Rex Chair include:

- Model 120 (1953): Plywood sidepieces were replaced with three-dimensionally turned, perforated plywood. The two extreme structural crosspieces on the front edge of the seat and the top of the back were removed and replaced by glued strips. The arm rests were made of bent wood.
- Model 101 (1954): A Rex Chair 120 variation that does not have armrests. Removing the armrests compromised structural stability of the chair, so two cross bindings were added between the back legs for strength.
- Model 5654 (1956): A collapsible variation model of 120 is the best-known chair in the REX family and is still being produced today as a low armchair intended to be used in covered areas. It has several varieties to suit its use, for example, as a club chair, a high-backed chair, or an auditorium chair.
- Model 140: Has a back that is connected to the front legs, which meet the diagonal rear legs in the middle section. The height of the back panel is the same as the classic Rex Chair, and whole plywood is used for the upper half of the back panel.
- Model 5652: A folding dining chair with a higher and shorter seat and legs that stand more vertically than in Model 101 (1954).
- The restaurant chair has perforated seat and back panels, straight, standing legs, and a slightly inclined back. It is suitable for loading.
- The Rex Program also included coffee tables, chaise lounges, and rocking chairs (Model 5655). Foreign manufacturers produced copies of the Rex Chair in plastic, which could also be used outdoors, but do not have the same aesthetics as the original.

== Production ==
The exclusive holder of the manufacturing and distribution rights to the REX chair is Impakta Les. The REX Collection in production today consists of the Rex Folding Chair, Rex Folding Lounge Chair, Rex Folding Rocking Chair, Rex Folding Daybed and Rex Folding Table. As of 2023, they have produced over 2 million REX chairs.

== Construction ==
=== First model (1952) ===
Made entirely of wood, this chair consisted of a solid beechwood frame that securely held pieces of bowed, rectangular-shaped plywood. The armrests, also made of solid wood with the front sections cut in a round shape, are joined statically to the two diagonal legs.

=== Second model ===
The ends of the curved sidepieces were fitted into the crosspieces at the edges of the seat and back panels, avoiding the use of visible wood screws on the front of the chair.

=== Third model ===
This is a prefabricated chair held together with nuts and bolts. The molded cross pieces create the seat and back panels. This was designed to address the problematic sharp bend between the seat and the back by shortening the individual rods. The seat and back are curved to the shape of the body with the rear legs extended into the armrest. The model required a lot of high-quality wood and produced a lot of waste.

=== Fourth model ===
The seat and back are the same as in the third model, with the armrest and the front and rear legs in one piece. It is made with veneers to minimized the amount of real wood used. The shortened armrests do not provide effective support.

=== Fifth model ===
The seat and the back are the same as in the third model. The front and back legs touch at the top and they spread apart diagonally downward. To support this A-shape, the plywood armrest, which is curved at a right angle (through high-frequency dielectric heating), is affixed to the upper section. The chair structure is strengthened further by the armrest being joined to the back panel.

=== Sixth model (1953) ===
The slats were shallowly set into the side element and not able to withstand the sudden weight. They were replaced by perforated, three-dimensionally, bent plywood shaped to the body's contours. The panels are inserted between two sidepieces. The edge pieces on the front of the seat panel and the top of the back panel are replaced by glued strips.

In 1954, Model No. 56 was accepted for mass production under the name Rex 120.
