= Frankfurt po Frankfurtu =

The Frankfurt After The Frankfurt (Slovene: Frankfurt po Frankfurtu) is the traditional Slovenian foreign books trade fair held each year in November at Mladinska knjiga, Bookstore Konzorcij, where a selection of the books published by foreign publishers and presented at Frankfurt Book Fair (Germany) the same year is presented and sold.

In 2018, it will be held in Cankarjev dom from 20. till 25. November.

== History ==
In 2016 it was the 30th edition of the fair in Ljubljana.
