= Zablujena generacija =

Zablujena generacija (Delusive or Stray generation) is a Slovene "saloon" punk - alternative rock musical group from Idrija.

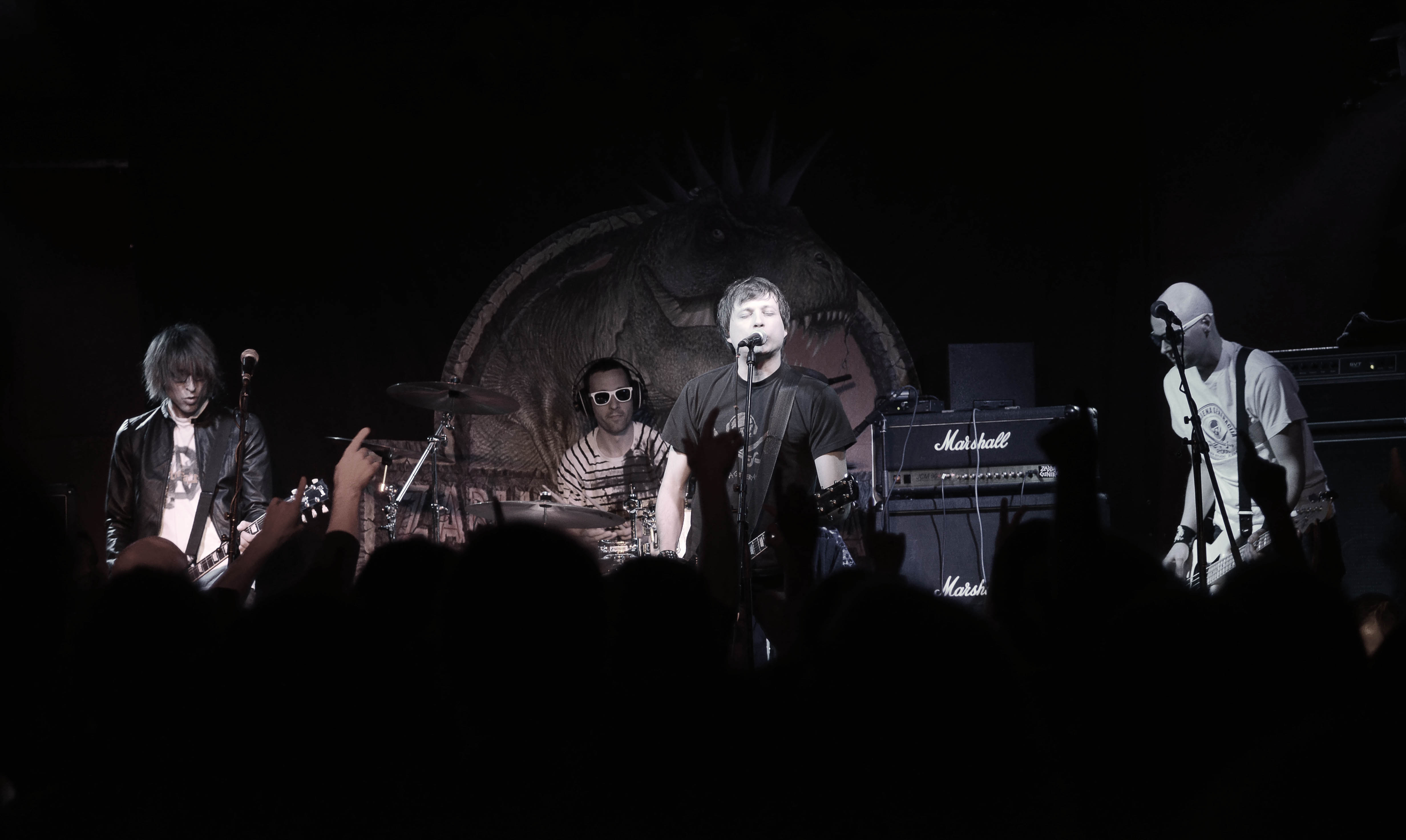
2008 concert

The group started out in 1994. The original lineup, who took their lead from the legendary American punkers The Ramones, was Primož Alič (vocal, guitar), Ramon (guitar), Aljoša (bass) and Igor Seljak (drums). In those days they played in different garages and cellars in Idrija, and it was there that their first songs originated. Bass guitarist Aljoša was later on substituted with Hanson in 1998.

Zablujena generacija is sometimes compared to blink-182 or The Offspring, but as they've been on the go since 1994, they have developed their own style.

The band has participated in a Slovenian contest EMA 2007 for the Eurovision Song Contest 2007 with a song Kdo hoče plesati z menoj (Who Wants To Dance With Me).

Their discography includes:

- Fajht (colloquial meaning of Inebriation), (Vinylmania Records 1997),
- Pank zabloda (Punk Aberration), (Vinylmania Records 1998),
- Compilation Drž`te jih! To niso Niet!!! (Stop 'em! They Aren't Niet!!!), (Vinylmania Records 1998).
- Ultra lahko (Ultra Light), (Vinylmania records 2000),
- Pozitiv vabrejšan (colloquial meaning of Positive Vibrations), (Menart 2001).
- Pop Idoli (Pop Idols)
- Mi smo stare pizde (We are old cunts), (Panker Studio 2008).

== See also ==
- Music of Slovenia,
- List of musicians in the second wave of punk music
