= Peter Lovšin =

Pero Lovšin
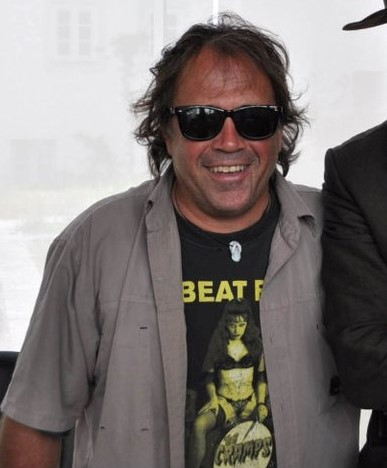
- Lovšin at a June 2011 reception held at the United States embassy in Ljubljana marking Bob Dylan's 70th birthday.

Background information
- Born: June 27, 1955 (age 69); Ljubljana, PR Slovenia, FPR Yugoslavia
- Origin: SR Slovenia, Yugoslavia (Now Slovenia)
- Genres: Punk rock, rock
- Occupation(s): Singer, composer

Peter "Pero" Lovšin (born June 27, 1955) is a Slovenian musician, songwriter and singer, best known as a frontman of the first Yugoslav punk rock group Pankrti. After a period with Pankrti in the 1980s, he formed a successful rock band Sokoli and later continued with a great solo career.

He is best known for working with rock music, but also with reggae in the later stages of his 30-year career. He supported the Sex Pistols on their 1996 tour and also played with Ivan Kral (Patti Smith, U2).

In the late 1990s and early 2000s, he organized several tours with folk rock musicians Vlado Kreslin and Zoran Predin. Among others, they composed the anthem of the Slovenia national football team for the 2000 European Football Championship.

== See also ==
- Punk rock in Yugoslavia
- New wave music in Yugoslavia
