= Bohem =

Bohem is a surname. Notable people with the surname include:

- Ciril Amorós Bohem (1904–?), Spanish footballer
- Endre Bohem (1901–1990), Hungarian-American screenwriter, film producer, and television writer
- Leslie Bohem (born 1951), American screenwriter and television writer
