= Slon in Sadež =

Slovenian musical group

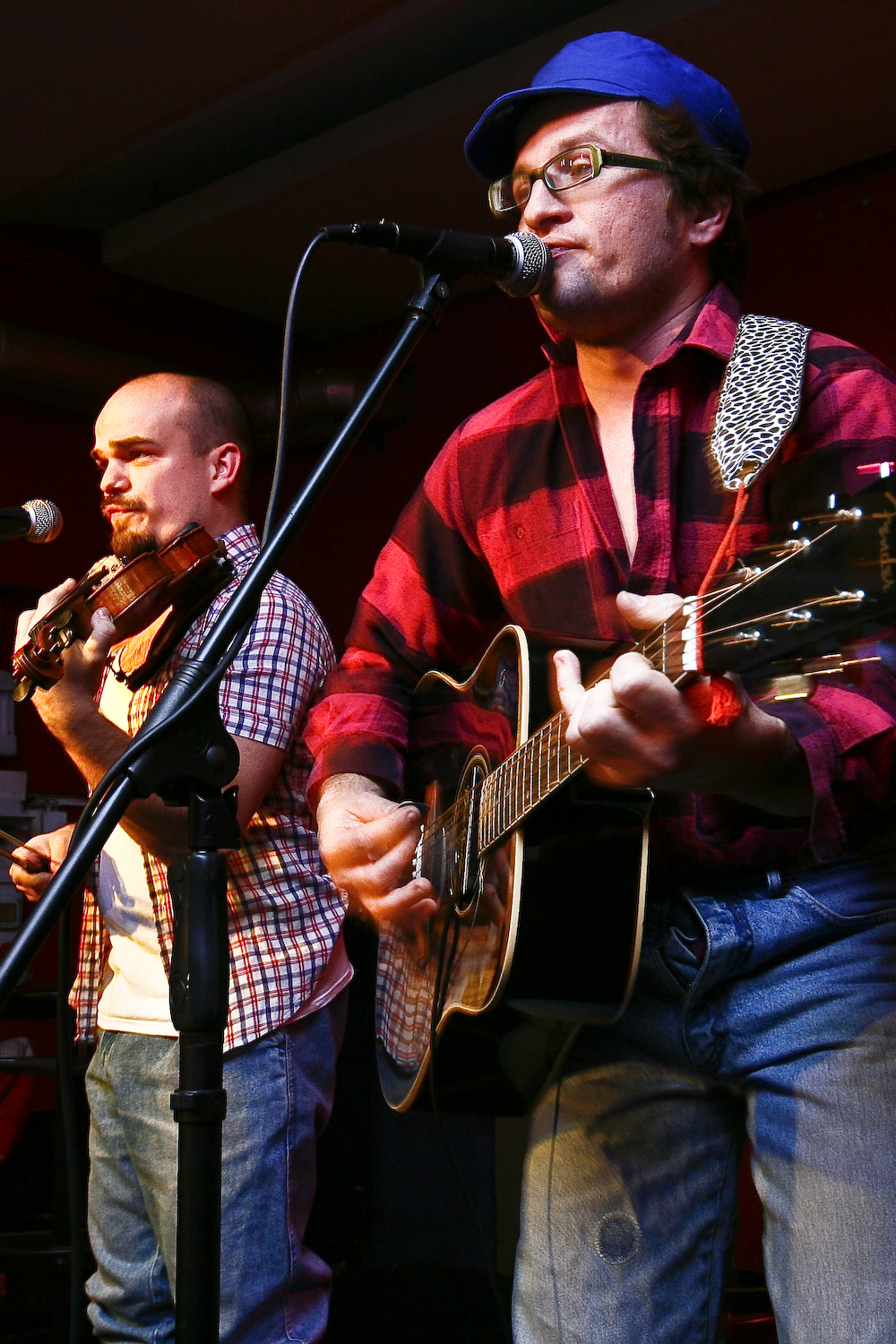
Slon and Sadež

Slon in Sadež (English: The Elephant and the Fruit) is a Slovenian musical group, formed in 2001 by Jure Karas (The Elephant) and Igor Bračič (The Fruit). They perform music of various genres. Their music is humorous and mostly politically orientated.

They discuss topics such as family violence, drug prohibition, entering NATO and violence in Guantanamo Bay. They also made a few parodies to popular Slovene turbo folk songs (Brizgalna brizga by Atomik Harmonik). Most of their music is in Slovene, but also in English (the hit Taliban Reggae) and in Serbian/Croatian.

The original duo also performs at Radio Center as Radio Slon in Sadež with humorous shows. There they often make fun of various Slovene dialects.

The other members of the group are Matjaž Ugovšek (nicknamed Ugo), Igor Brvar (Jovo) (later left the group), Rok Šinkovec and Rok Kovačič - Fish. Matej Horvat and Samo Šalomon played in the group in years 2007 and 2008.

In 2004, Slon in Sadež received the Slovenian media award Viktor as prominent media personalities. In 2008, they hosted the Viktor Award show.

Jure Karas and Igor Bračič are also known as iGor and iVan. They play "White iPhone Song" and "Like it iz" in commercials.

== Discography ==
- 2001: Kabare
- 2004: Komercialne pizde
- 2005: Štafeta mladosti
- 2007: Radio Slon in Sadež
- 2010: Sponzorska plata
