= Primož Ramovš =

Slovenian composer

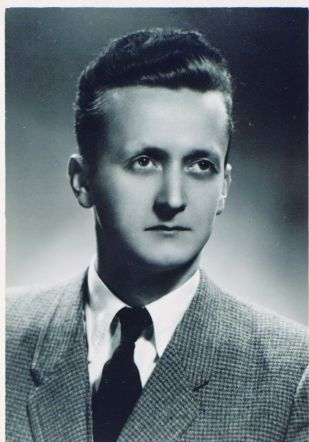
Image of Primož Ramovš

Primož Ramovš (March 20, 1921 – January 10, 1999) was a Slovenian composer and librarian.

== Life ==
Ramovš was born in Ljubljana, then the administrative centre of the Slovenian part of the Kingdom of Serbs, Croats and Slovenes. He studied at the Ljubljana Academy of Music from 1935 to 1941 under Slavko Osterc. Afterwards, he studied in Siena under Vito Frazzi in 1941 and in Rome with Goffredo Petrassi and Alfredo Casella from 1941 to 1943. From 1945, he worked as a librarian at the Slovenian Academy of Sciences and Arts and was the director of its library from 1952 until 1987. He also taught at the Ljubljana Conservatory from 1948 to 1964. He died in Ljubljana at the age of 78 years.

== Musical style ==
Ramovš was a pioneer of Slovenian musical avant-garde and one of the most prolific Slovenian composers. Throughout his career, Ramovš wrote almost exclusively instrumental music, for which he found inspiration in the abstract world. His early works are neoclassical in style, but during the 1950s he adopted a more modern style and became a leader of the Slovenian avant-garde. His works from the 1960s and 70s employ serialism and other modernist techniques, including experiments bordering on graphic notation and use of indeterminacy. He often experimented, even in very extreme sense: "If the result is negative, it will fall away by itself, but if it is positive, then it will be a new step in the development of music, which should never stop, but must go hand in hand with the times to build up our culture."

== Works ==
- 6 symphonies (1940, 1943, 1948, Simfonija 68 1968, Simfonija med klavirjem in orkestrom [Symphony between piano and orchestra] 1970, Simfonija Pietà 1995) and a sinfonietta (1951)
- Kolovrat, string orchestra (1986)
- Contrasts, flute and orchestra (1966)
- Syntheses, horn and ensemble (1971)
- Concerto profano, organ and orchestra (1984)
- Concerto for violin, viola and orchestra (1961)
- Trumpet concerto (1985)
- Transformacije (Transformations) for 2 violas and 10 string instruments (1963)
- Tryptychon, string quartet (1969)
- 3 Nocturnes, double bass (1972)
- Improvisations, harp (1973)
- Aforizmi (Aphorisms) for viola and piano (1964)
- Nokturno for viola and piano (1959)
- Skice (Sketches) for viola and piano (1958)
- Za harmoniko (For Accordion) for solo accordion (1983), performed by Dean Delgiusto
- Viribus unitis for violin, guitar and accordion (1983)
- Ernönek for classical accordion (1986)
- Izpolnjena želja (Fulfilled Wish) for two accordions (1997)
- Film music
