= Pino Mlakar =

Slovenian ballet dancer and choreographer (1907–2006)

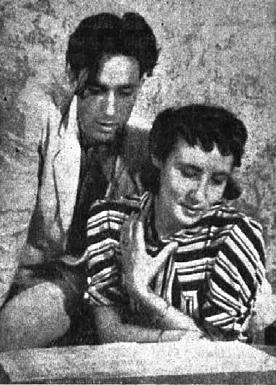
Pino and Pia Mlakar

Pino Mlakar (2 March 1907, Novo Mesto – 30 September 2006) was a Slovenian ballet dancer, choreographer, and teacher.

== Biography ==
Pino Mlakar was born in Novo Mesto and baptized Jožef Mlaker, the son of the court official Ivan Mlaker (1858–1924) and Marjeta (née Rodica) Mlakar (1864–1930).

In 1927, he graduated from the Rudolf Laban Choreographic Institute in Hamburg. He was a member of the Ljubljana Opera and Ballet Company from 1946 to 1960. For 25 years, he was a full professor at the Academy for Theatre, Radio, Film and Television (AGRFT) of the University of Ljubljana.

In 1929, he married fellow choreographer Maria Luiza Pia Beatrice Scholz (1910–2000), who was professionally known as Pia Mlakar. Their daughter Veronika Mlakar was also a ballet dancer.

He officially changed his name from Jožef Mlaker to Pino Mlakar in 1999.

He died in Novo Mesto.
