= Adi Smolar =

Slovenian singer-songwriter and composer (born 1959)

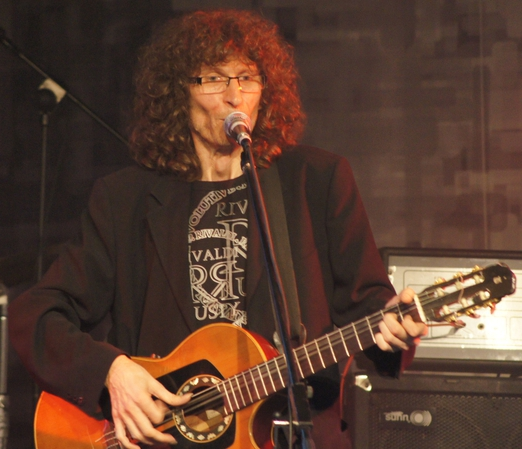
- Adi Smolar in 2011

Background information
- Born: 25 March 1959 (age 67)
- Origin: Slovenj Gradec, SR Slovenia, Yugoslavia (Now Slovenia)
- Occupations: Singer, composer
- Years active: 1981–present

Adi Smolar (born 25 March 1959 in Slovenj Gradec, SR Slovenia, Yugoslavia) is a Slovenian singer-songwriter and composer.

In his youth, he played the accordion and clarinet and was a member in several choirs. At the age of eighteen, he decided to start playing the guitar, the instrument for which he is most known today.

In 1981, he made his first appearance with a full repertoire of original songs. He continued to perform for eight years, before releasing his first album Naš svet se pa vrti, '(Our World Keeps Spinning)' in 1989.

He has also authored seven children's books which were published between 1996 and 2014.

Smolar received the Ježek Award in 2008.

In 2024, Smolar performed at the charity concert for Gaza hosted at the Kino Šiška in Ljubljana on 16 May. Funds were raised for the charity Medical Aid for Palestinians.

== Published works ==
Albums by Adi Smolar
Title	Year	Notes	Ref.
Our World Keeps Spinning	1989		
Eh, So What?	1993	live	
Maladjusted	1994	With the Flying Vagabonds	
The TV Better Not Croak	1995	With the Flying Vagabonds	
We All Go Through It	1996		
I'm Nuts	1997		
From A to S	1998	compilation album	
Gotta Work, Man	1999		
Not Going to School	2000		
Have No Fear	2001		
Concert	2002	live	
Everything's Just Fine	2004		
Telling the Truth	2008		
First Five	2008	compilation album	
Take It Easy and You'll Go Far	2011	With Mestni postopači	
Just Now	2018		
Songwriters' Dog Days	2022	compilation album	

Books by Adi Smolar
Title	Year	ISBN	Ref.
Slovene: Pujsa in Andrej Migec, lit. 'Guinea Pig and Andrej Migec'	1996	ISBN 9616008080	
Slovene: Jezikovni kotliček, lit. 'Linguistic Kettle'	2011	ISBN 9789616840101	
Slovene: Zgodba o rolici papirja, lit. 'Tale of a Paper Roll'	2012		
Slovene: Radovedna putka, lit. 'Curious Hen'	2013	ISBN 9789619329221	
Slovene: Domišljava žaba, lit. 'Conceited Frog'	2013	ISBN 9789619329238	
Slovene: Jaz ne grem v šolo, lit. 'Not Going to School'	2014		
