= Slavko Osterc Ensemble =

Slovenian chamber orchestra

The Slavko Osterc Ensemble (Ansambel Slavko Osterc) was a Slovenian chamber orchestra formed under the direction of Ivo Petrič in 1962. Named after Slovenian composer Slavko Osterc, the ensemble toured throughout Europe performing works by modern composers active in the former Yugoslavian countries. Over 130 works were commissioned for and performed by the group during its 20-year existence. The group was re-formed in the 2000s with new musicians and continues to perform new avant-garde works.
