= Zorko Prelovec =

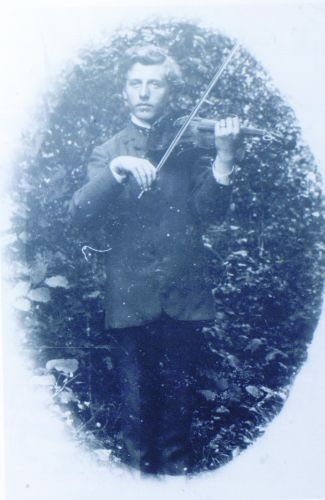
- Zorko Prelovec playing a violin.
- Born: February 11, 1887; Idrija, Goriška, Austria-Hungary
- Died: February 25, 1939 (aged 52); Ljubljana, City Municipality of Ljubljana, Kingdom of Yugoslavia
- Occupation: Composer

Zorko Prelovec was a Slovene composer, well known for his choral works and Lieder. He was also active as a choral conductor, leading the Ljubljana Mercury choir from 1900. It has been said that he was a musical poet and that his compositions for choirs are filled with a soft, tender sentimentality.
