= Punch Festival =

The Punch Festival (in Slovene phonetically also Panč festival) is the most visited stand up comedy festival held in Ljubljana, Slovenia. The festival started in 2008. The festival now attracts around 1.200 people. From 2011 on, it is held twice per year as the Summer and Winter Punch.
