= Anton Lajovic =

Slovenian composer (1878–1960)

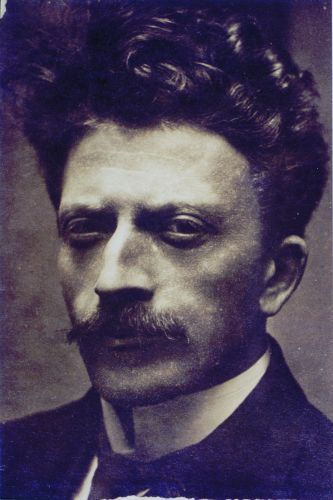
Anton Lajovic

Anton Lajovic (December 19, 1878 in Vače – August 28, 1960 in Ljubljana) was a Slovenian composer. He was noted for his Lieder and was influenced by the late-romantic French school.
