= Johann Berthold von Höffer =

- Born: July 24, 1667; Ljubljana
- Died: 1718
- Occupation: Composer

Johann Berthold von Höffer (born in Ljubljana on 24 July 1667 - died 1718) was a nobleman from Ljubljana, and an amateur Slovenian composer. He founded The Academia Philharmonicorum, Ljubljana in 1701, and primarily composed Latin oratorios. His artistic name in the Academia was Operose Devius.

== See also ==
- Ljubljana Academy of Music
