= Alojz Geržinič =

Slovenian composer

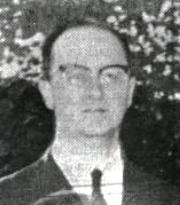
Alojz Geržinič (1960s)

Alojz Geržinič (11 June 1915 – 26 March 2008) was a Slovenian composer. Many of his compositions are for voice. A native of Ljubljana, he lived and worked in Buenos Aires, Argentina from 1948 until his death in 2008. He was one of the founders of the Argentinian group Slovenska Kultura Akcija (SKA).

== Composing opus ==
=== Vocal compositions ===
- Villancico for mixed choir (1979)
- Loški zvon for mixed choir
- Ave Maria for women choir
- Dona primavera for women choir
- Rad bi še živel for women trio and bariton (1965).

=== Vocal-instrumental compositions ===
- Una vieja historia for women trio and piano (1967)
- Lo que vos querais, señor for women duo and piano (1979)
- Dedek Samonog for vocal and piano (1975)
- Poletna noč I for vocal and piano (1988)
- Poletna noč II for vocal and piano (1988)

=== Instrumental solo compositions ===
- Fantazija for piano (1967)

== See also ==
- List of Slovenian composers
