= Ivo Petrić =

Slovenian composer (1931–2018)

- Born: June 16, 1931; Ljubljana, Slovenia
- Died: September 13, 2018 (aged 87) Ljubljana, Slovenia
- Genres: Classical
- Occupations: Composer, oboist
- Instrument: Oboe

Ivo Petrić (16 June 1931 – 13 September 2018) was a Slovenian composer of European classical music.

== Biography ==
Petrić was educated at the Academy of Music in Ljubljana from 1952 to 1958. After completing his studies at the Academy, he conducted and toured with the Slavko Osterc chamber music ensemble until 1982. In 1979, he became Artistic Director of the Slovenian Philharmonic Orchestra, a position he held until his retirement in 1995. After his retirement, Petrić concentrated on publishing his extensive original works on compact disc.

== Notable works ==
Petrić's catalogue of works is extensive and extremely diverse. In February 2016, he was given the Prešeren Award, the highest Slovenian award in the field of artistic creation, for lifetime achievement. Some of his most prominent works are:

- Symphony No. 1 "Goga" (1954/60)
- Concerto grosso (1955)
- Symphony No. 2 (1957)
- Symphony No. 3 (1960)
- Symphonic Mutations (1964)
- several string quartets
- four wind quintets
- The Song of Life cantata for mezzo-soprano and orchestra on texts by Srečko Kosovel, Ivan Cankar and France Forstnerič (1995)
- concertos for flute, clarinet, harp, trumpet, horn, alto saxophone, and marimba
- sonatas for bassoon, oboe, flute, clarinet, horn, alto saxophone, violin, trumpet, and piano
