= Josip Pavčič =

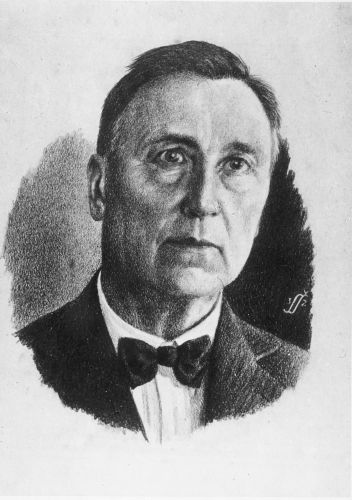
Josip Pavčič

Josip Pavčič (Velike Lašče 18 July 1870 – Ljubljana 24 September 1949) was a Slovenian composer and organist. He was popular with choral societies, and for his art songs.

His father was a teacher, organist, composer and conductor. After finishing high school in Kranj, Pavčič went to Ljubljana where he studied with Anton Nedvĕdu, then training at the Vienna Conservatory.

His songs are mostly miniatures in late romantic style either for piano and choir, or soloist. The cycle Ciciban to poems of Oton Župančič remain most popular.

== Works ==
Editions

- Samospevi za visoki glas - songs for soprano.
- Samospevi za srednji glas - songs for tenor.

Recordings

- Dedek samonog (Grandpa One-Leg) Bernarda Fink.
