= Uroš Krek =

Slovenian composer (1922–2008)

Uroš Krek

Uroš Krek (May 21, 1922 – May 3, 2008) was a Slovenian composer. A native of Ljubljana, he died in Jesenice. He worked for many years for Radiotelevizija Slovenija, and composed a number of soundtracks. Krek was a pupil of Lucijan Marija Škerjanc.

== Biography ==
He studied at the Academy of Music in Ljubljana, under Lucijan Marija Škerjanc, and later graduated in 1947. He was also an editor of symphonic broadcasts and later a chief editor of music on Radiotelevizija Slovenija. From 1968 until 1982 he taught at the Music Academy in Ljubljana at the Institute of Ethnomusicology, as a professor of composition and music theory. At one point Uroš Krek was a president of the Society of Slovenian Composers.

Krek was a regular member of the Slovenian Academy of Sciences and Arts (SASA) and corresponding member of the Croatian Academy of Arts and Sciences.

Although he was strongly influenced by earlier 20th-century classical music and use of neo-classicist aesthetics, he was also noted for incorporating elements of folklore into his compositions.

Krek's compositions covered virtually all musical ensembles, but his best work was created for stringed instruments. His music has also been performed in drama, and theatrical and film music. Amongst his compositions are his Sinfonietta from 1951, the Concerto for Violin and Orchestra, the Concertino for piccolo and orchestra and the Concerto for Horn and String Orchestra. He also created choral music and chamber music such as the Second Sonata for Violin and Piano and Canto for Viola and Harp.

== Awards ==
Krek's violin concerto won him his first Prešeren Award in 1949. In 1975 and 1976 he received the award for Badjurovo music. In 1988 he was appointed an honorary member of the Slovenian Philharmonic and in 1995 attained another title from the University of Ljubljana. In 1992 he received the Prešeren Award for Lifetime Achievement.

== Death and legacy ==
He died on May 3, 2008, after a long illness. On November 20, 2008, a concert by the Slovenian Symphony Orchestra was held in the Cankar Centre's Gallus Hall in Ljubljana in his memory. The orchestra, conducted by Marko Letonja, featured soloist Jože Kotar on clarinet. They performed a number of pieces such as Krek's Concert Fantasia for Clarinet and Orchestra but also the late-Romantic Richard Strauss's Der Rosenkavalier suite.

== See also ==
- List of Slovenian composers
- List of Prešeren laureates
