= Šank Rock =

Slovenian rock group

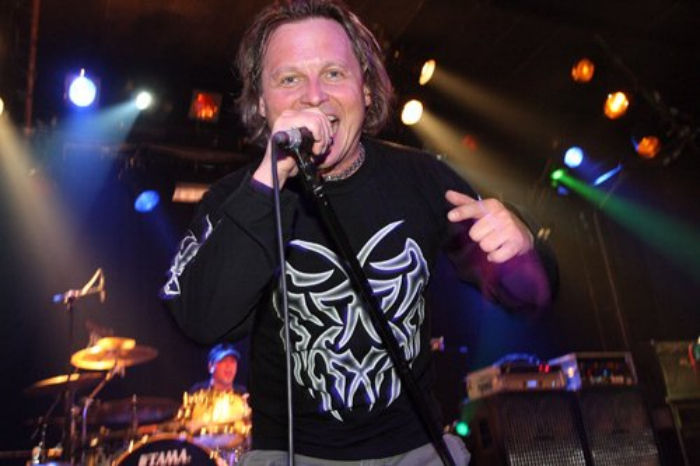
Matjaž Jelen

Šank Rock or Shank Rock, is a five-piece Slovenian rock group from Velenje, formed in 1982. Their first album Pridite na žur was released in 1987. The band was on hiatus from 1999 to 2002. In 2006 the band separated with their guitarist Bor Zuljan and replaced him with Rok Petkovič, with whom they made their 14th album Senca sebe which received a lot of success. In January 2011, the bassist Cvetko Polak and the singer Matjaž Jelen left the group because of disagreements. The group disbanded after that. The group reassembled in 2014 with a different line-up.

Their greatest distinction is probably that their music remains the same as it was from the beginning. They have not succumbed to modern music influences and that is what makes them unique phenomena on Slovenian hard rock scene.

== Current members ==
- Matjaž Jelen - vocals (1982 - 1998, 2002 - 2010, 2014 -)
- Bor Zuljan - guitars (1990 - 1998, 2002 - 2006, 2014 -)
- Cveto Polak - bass (1982 - 1994, 2002- 2010, 2014 -)
- Samo Jezovšek - keyboards (2018 -)
- Aleš Uranjek - drums (1982 - 1997, 2002 - 2010, 2023 -)

== Former members ==
- Roman Ratej - drums (2014 - 2023)
- Davor Klarič - keyboards (1982 - 2010)
- Roki Petkovič - guitars (2005 - 2010)
- Peter Slanič - keyboards (? - 1988)
- Miro Mramor - guitars (? - 1988)
- Zvone Hranjec - guitars (1982 - 1990)
- Inko Brus - bass (1994 - 1998)
- Silvano Leban - drums (1997 - 1998)

== Discography ==
- Pridite na žur, 1987
- Dobro in zlo, 1988
- Jaz nimam noč za spanje, 1990
- Šank rock IV, 1991
- Moj nočni blues, 1992
- V živo na mrtvo, 1993 (live)
- Crime time, 1995
- Bosa dama, 1996 (unplugged)
- Poglej v svet, 1996
- Šank rock X, 1998
- Od šanka do rocka, 2002
- Vzemi ali pusti, 2003
- Na mrtvo v živo, 2004 (live)
- Senca sebe, 2007
- 25 let - Velenje, 2008 (live)
- Restart, 2015
- Nekaj več, 2017
- Se še spomniš, 2023
- Šank rock: Romantično, 2025 (live)

== Greatest hits ==
- Puščava sna
- Pridite na žur
- Hitro drugam
- Metulj
- Dobro in zlo
- Jaz nimam noč za spanje
- Rockerji
- Verjemi mi
- Le 17
- Laški pir
- Maček
- Pravljica o mavričnih ljudeh
- Jaz in Ti
- Ker te ljubim
- Tih' bod' in igraj!
- Želim, da si tu
- Vzemi ali pusti
- Hvala za vse
- TV
- Delam, kar paše mi
- Dej bolj na glas radio ( feat. 6 Pack Čukur)
- Hočeš, nočeš (feat. Natalija Verboten)
- Nekaj pod kožo
- Senca sebe
- D'j se mal' nasmej
