= Zoran Predin =

Slovenian singer-songwriter

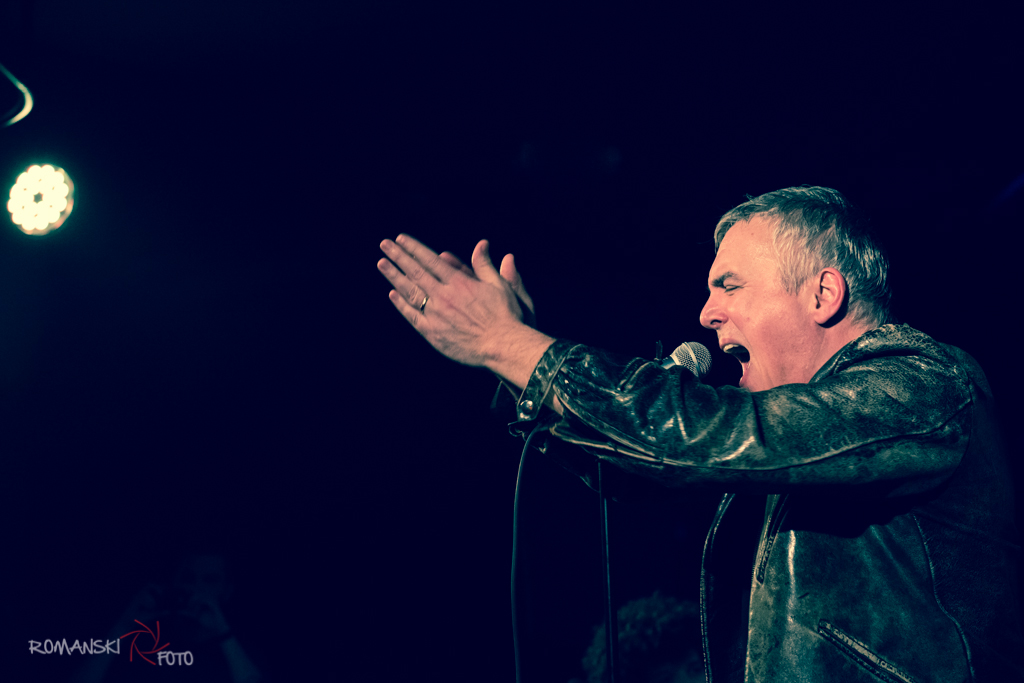
- Predin in 2013

Background information
- Born: Zoran Predin; 16 June 1958 (age 68)
- Origin: Maribor, Slovenia
- Genres: Pop, rock, jazz
- Occupations: Musician, singer, songwriter, record producer
- Instrument: Guitar
- Years active: 1980–present
- Labels: Helidon, Discoton, Conan, Kud Levi breg, Dallas Records, Hayat Production
- Formerly of: Lačni Franz
- Website: http://www.predin.com/

Zoran Predin (born 16 June 1958) is a Slovenian singer-songwriter from Maribor. In the 1980s, he was the front man of the new wave rock band Lačni Franz. He also writes music for film, television, and theatre.

In the late 1990s and early 2000s, he went on several tours with the rock singers Pero Lovšin and Vlado Kreslin. Among others, they composed the anthem of the Slovenia national football team for the 2000 European Football Championship.

He has also been active in public life. In the late 1990s, he publicly supported the Liberal Democracy of Slovenia.

== Solo discography ==
Albums:

- Svjedoci-Priče (1989)
- Gate na glavo (1992)
- Napad ljubezni (1994)
- Mentol bonbon (1996)
- Ljubimec iz omare (1998)
- All-purpose lover (1999)
- Tretji človek (2000)
- Lovec na sanje (2001)
- V živo gre zares (2002)
- Praslovan MP3 (2002)
- Strup za punce (2003)
- Na krilih prvega poljuba (2003)
- Žarnica za boljši jutri (2005)
- Čas za malo nežnosti (2006)
- Za šaku ljubavi (2007)
- Pod srečno zvezdo (2008)
- Inventura (2008)
