= Zaklonišče prepeva =

Rock Band

Zaklonišče Prepeva
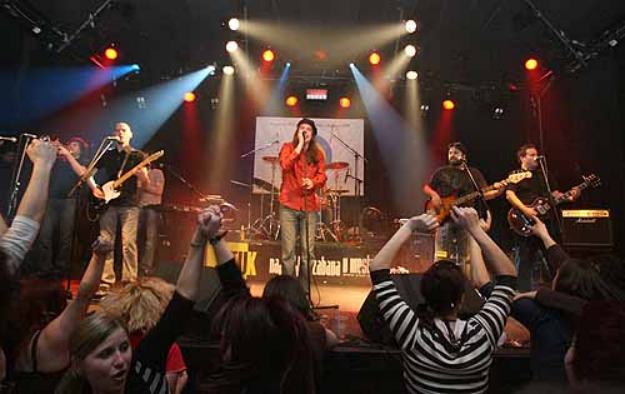
- Zaklonišče Prepeva hosting a concert

Background information
- Origin: Nova Gorica, Slovenia
- Genres: Rock
- Years active: 1994–present
- Members: Vanja Alič; Miha Jerovec; Uroš Buh; Mitja Marussig; Peter Baroš

Zaklonišče prepeva (lit. 'Adaptation shelter' or 'Singing shelter') is a Slovenian rock band from Nova Gorica founded in 1994. Most of their lyrics are in Serbo-Croatian and contain certain amounts of yugo-nostalgia.

They published their first album, Nešto kao Džimi Hendrix (Something like Jimi Hendrix) in 1996. Zaklonišče prepeva became famous after creating an adaptation of Rani Mraz's Računajte na nas.

Their third album, Glasajte za nas (Vote for us), was controversial as the television video for the song Vote for us was banned prior to Slovenian elections in 2000. The reasoning was that their fictional candidate, Kradimir Pendreković (Thief Nightstick) might have resembled some real candidates.

== Discography ==
- Nešto kao Džimi Hendrix, Shelter Records/Panika 1996
- Novo vreme - stare dileme, Shelter Records/NIKA 1998
- Glasajte za nas, Shelter Records/NIKA 1999
- Odoh majko u rokere, Nika Records, 2001
- Sellam Alejkum, Menart Records, 2004
- Bolje ne bo nikoli, Lip Art, 2009
- Samo da prođe demokratija, Lip Art, 2014
