= Slavko Osterc =

Slovenian composer (1895-1941)

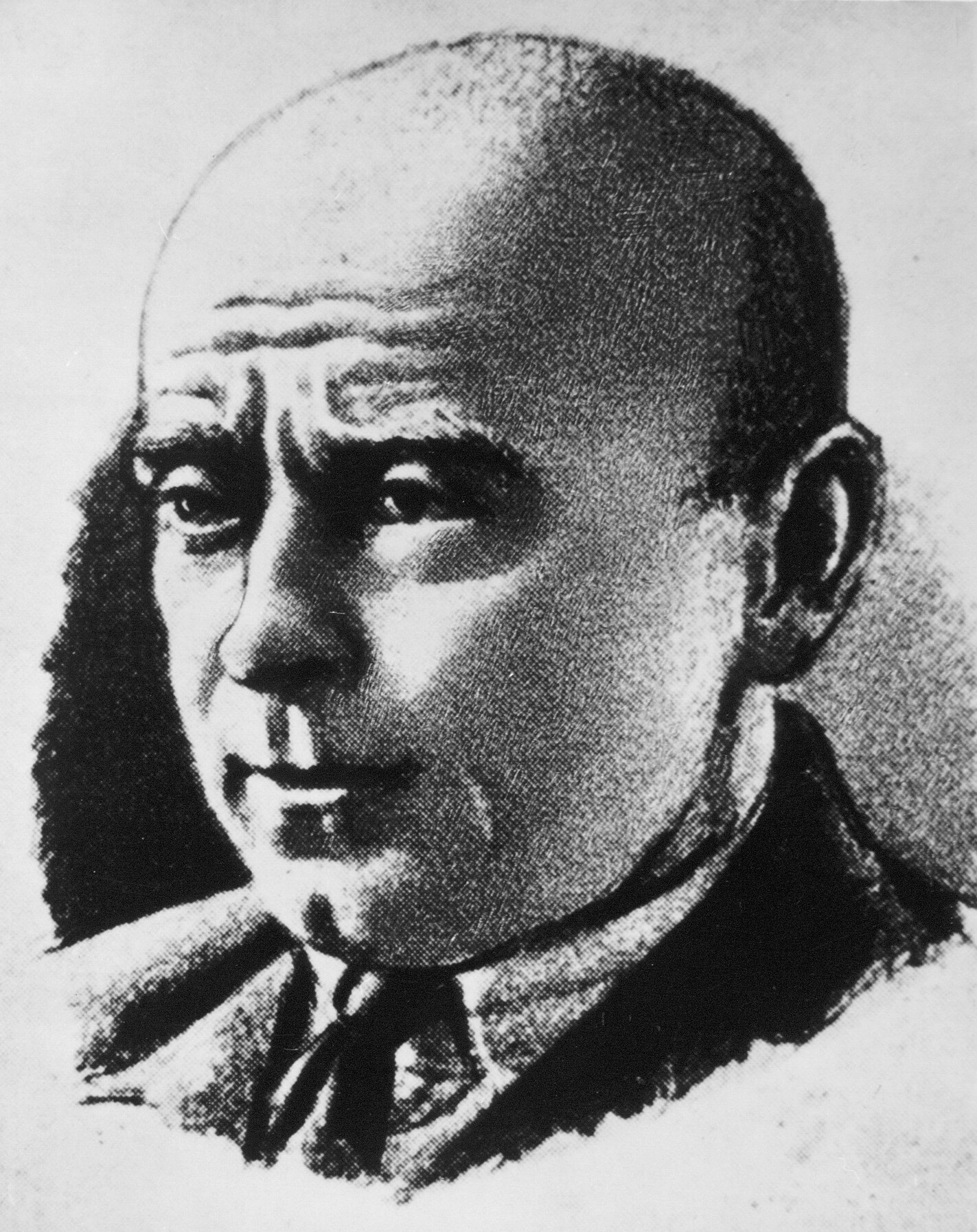
Slavko Osterc in the 1930s

Slavko Osterc (17 June 1895 – 23 May 1941), was a Slovenian composer.

Osterc was born in Veržej. He studied under Emerik Beran, who was a pupil of Leoš Janáček, in his youth before attending the Prague Conservatory from 1925 to 1927. While there he studied under Karel Boleslav Jirák, Vítězslav Novák, and Alois Hába. Osterc was a professor at the Ljubljana Conservatory for much of his career, remaining there until his death. He was much the leading composer of Slovenia in the 1930s, as Marij Kogoj had been in the 1920s. One of his pupils was Pavel Šivic.

== Works ==
Note: This list is incomplete.

Operas

- Krst pri Savici (The Baptism on the Savica, after France Prešeren's The Baptism on the Savica, 1921)
- Osveta (after Theodor Körner, 1923)
- Iz komične opere (From the Comic Opera, after Henri Murger, 1928)
- Krog s kredo (The Chalk Circle, after Klabund, 1928/29)
- Saloma (Salome, 1929/30)
- Dandin v vicah (Dandin in Purgatory, after Molière and Hans Sachs, 1930)
- Medea (after Euripides), 1930

Ballets

- Iz Satanovega Dnevnika (From Satan's Diary, 1924)
- Maska rdeče smrti (The Masque of the Red Death, 1930)
- Illusions (1938–40)

Orchestral

- The Baptism on the Savica (symphonic picture, 1921)
- Bagatelles (1922)
- Symphony (1922)
- Suite (1929)
- Concerto for Orchestra (1932)
- Ouverture classique (1932)
- Concerto (1933)
- Passacaglia and Chorale (1934)
- Danses (1935)
- Mouvements symphoniques (1936)
- 4 pieces symphoniques (1938–39)
- Mati (Mother; symphonic poem, 1940)

Other

- Various works for voice; piano works; chamber music.
