= Vlado Kreslin =

Slovenian musician

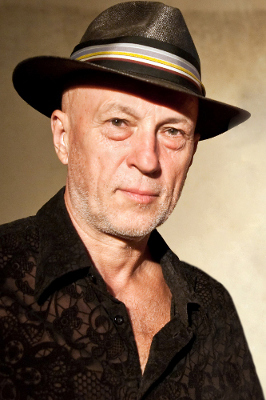
- Vlado Kreslin

Background information
- Born: 29 November 1953 (age 72)
- Origin: Beltinci, People's Republic of Slovenia, Federal People's Republic of Yugoslavia
- Genres: folk rock
- Occupations: Singer, composer, poet
- Website: Vlado Kreslin official website

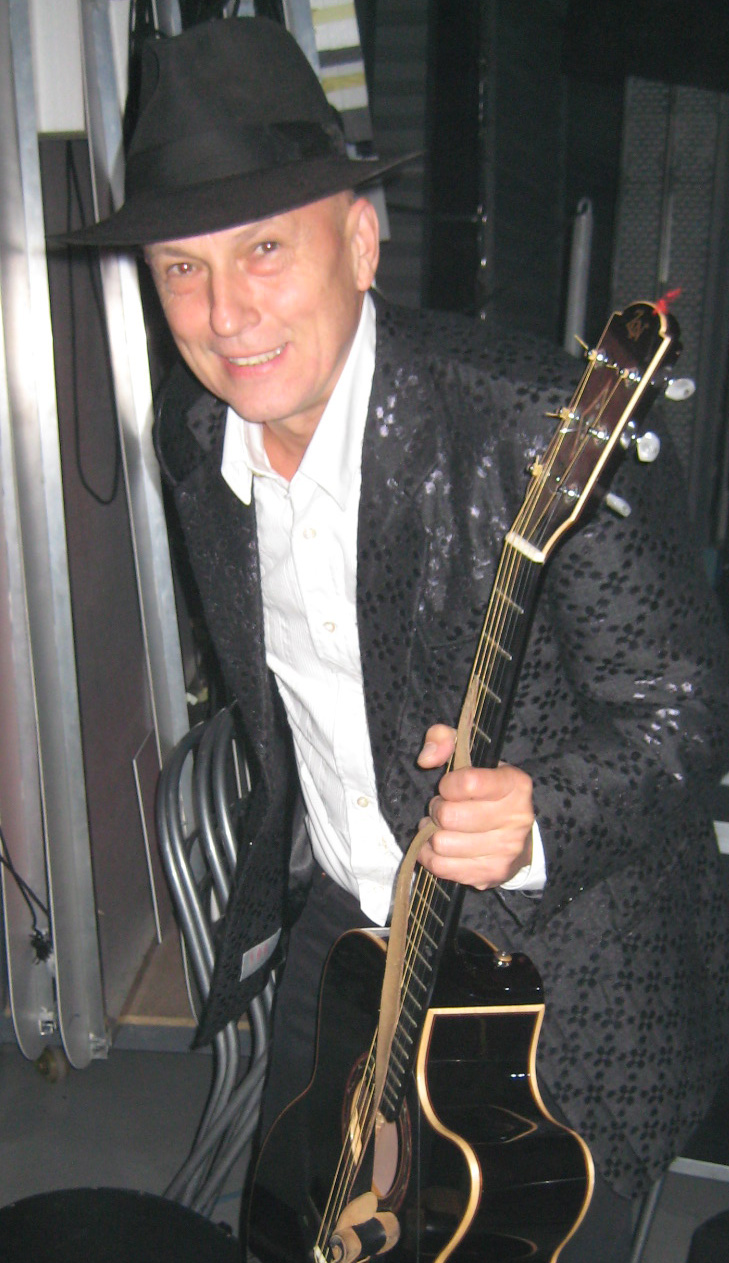
Vlado Kreslin with his black guitar

Vlado Kreslin (born 29 November 1953) is a Slovenian singer-songwriter and folk rock musician.

== Life and work ==
Kreslin was born in the village of Beltinci in the Prekmurje region of Slovenia, then part of Yugoslavia. He began his musical career in his student years, first coming to acclaim as the lead singer with the rock group Martin Krpan. He later continued playing a mixture of Slovene folk and rock music with the Beltinška Banda, a folk group from his native village, whose other members were all over 70 years old, and the group Mali Bogovi. Both groups (with him) often perform together, mixing several generations onstage together.

Today, he is a Slovenian musician and songwriter, drawing on Slovene folk and ethnic heritage, occupying a niche in the Slovenian music scene. He has been referred to as an ethno-revivalist for his modernization of Slovenian folk songs such as "All the Wreaths Have Wilted". Modern Slovenian rock bands such as Siddharta have worked with him. He has also performed with R.E.M., the Dubliners, Allan Taylor, Hans Theessink, Vlatko Stefanovski, Antonella Ruggiero, Barcelona Gipsy and Klezmer Orchestra. The Walkabouts, Freres Guisse, Feng Mantian, Senidah....

He performs annual concerts at Cankar Hall in Ljubljana in the city's yearly cultural calendar. He performs worldwide and has opened twice for Bob Dylan and some other world acts. His genre is a type of blues mixed with Slovene folk music. In addition to performing songs in Slovenian, Kreslin's repertoire also includes songs sung in English, Bosnian/Croatian/Serbian and Italian, as well as folk songs sung in various dialects (from his native Prekmurje, Međimurje, the Slovenian Littoral, Istria, and elsewhere).

Many of his songs and poems have been the basis for books and films, most notably Namesto koga roža cveti, which inspired Feri Laišček's award-winning book of the same name and was the basis for the movie Halgato. He has also been an actor in several movies, including Halgato and Slavic Angel, and the play Three Other Sisters in Milwaukee.

In 2009, he was invited by Yale University to be honored at a Master's Tea, and there he was awarded the honorary title of Quincey Porter Fellow. His poems have been published in Poetry in Translation and Confrontation, and in 2012, Guernica Editions will publish his book of poems, Instead of Whom Does the Flower Bloom. In 2014, Ruth Dupre and author from Dallas, Texas wrote a book "Vlado Kreslin, Slovenia and Me". In 2018, a documentary on Vlado Kreslin was filmed by Miran Zupanič (Arsmedia).

== Discography ==
The following are recordings:

Vlado Kreslin – cassette (ZKP RTV Ljubljana, 1985)

- Od višine se zvrti - Martin Krpan, LP (ZKP RTV Ljubljana,1986)
- Bogovi in ovce – Martin Krpan, LP (ZKP RTV Ljubljana,1990)
- Namesto koga roža cveti - CD (ZKP RTV LJubljana,1991)
- Spominčice – Vlado Kreslin in Beltinška banda, CD (Bistrica1992)
- Najlepša leta našega življenja – Vlado Kreslin in Beltinška banda, CD (BIstrica,1993)
- Nekega jutra, ko se zdani – Vlado Kreslin in Mali bogovi, CD (BIstrica,1994)
- Pikapolonica – Vlado Kreslin, Mali bogovi in Beltinška banda, CD (Čarna,1996)
- Muzika – CD (Založba Kreslin, 1998)
- Ptič – Vlado Kreslin CD (Založba Kreslin, 2000)
- Kreslinčice – Vlado Kreslin 2 CD (Založba Kreslin, 2002)
- Woyzeck – Vlado Kreslin (SNG Drama, Ljubljana), CD 2002
- Generacija – Vlado Kreslin CD (Založba Kreslin, 2003)
- Koncert – Vlado Kreslin LIVE CD and 2 DVD (Založba Kreslin, 2005)
- Cesta – Vlado Kreslin CD (Založba Kreslin, 2007)
- Drevored – Vlado Kreslin CD (Založba Kreslin, 2010)
- LIVE in Cankarjev dom – Vlado Kreslin(1992–2011)(Založba Kreslin, 2011)
- Umjesto koga roža cveti – Vlado Kreslin (Dallas, 2013)
- Če bi midva se kdaj srečala – CD (Založba Kreslin, 2015)
- Balkan Reunion – Barcelona Gipsy & Klezmer Orchestra & Vlado Kreslin CD, (Diggers Music, Barcelona, 2016),
- Never Lose Your Soul – Guisse – Kreslin – Leonardi CD (Intek, 2017)
- Greatest Hits – Vlado Kreslin 2 CD (Croatia Records, 2019)
- Kreslinovanje – Vlado Kreslin 2 Live CD (ZKP RTV Slovenija, 2019)
- Kreslinovanje – Vlado Kreslin LIVE 2 LP (ZKP RTV SLo, 2019)
- Kaj naj ti prinesem, draga – Vlado Kreslin CD (2019, Založba Kreslin)
- Namesto koga roža cveti - Vlado Kreslin LP (ZKP RTV SLO, 2021)

=== Books ===
- 1991 – Namesto koga roža cveti / Sonček je in ti si skuštrana – Vlado Kreslin and Zoran Predin, book of poems (Lokvanj in Založba M&M)
- 1999 – Besedila pesmi – Vlado Kreslin, lyrics with translations in English, German and Italian and a dictionary (Založba Drava, Celovec in Založba Čarna, Ljubljana)
- 1999 – Pesmarica – songbook (Založba Kreslin)
- 2003 – Vriskanje in jok – book of poems (Založba GOGA)
- 2006 – Venci – Povest o Beltinški bandi, book of poems and DVD (Založba Kreslin)
- 2009 – Pojezije – book of poems (Založba Kreslin)
- 2010 – Umijesto koga ruža cvijeta – book of poems (transl. A.Burić, založba Šahinpahić, Sarajevo)
- 2010 – Prije nego otvoriš oči – book of poems (transl. G.Filipi, založba Dominović, Zagreb)
- 2012 - Pesmarica 2 (Založba Kreslin)
- 2012 – Instead of Whom Does the Flower Bloom – The Poems of Vlado Kreslin (transl. Urška Charney, Guernica Editions Inc.Toronto)
- 2018 – Zakartana ura - book of poems (Beletrina)
- 2019 – Prokockani sat - book of poems (transl. M.Vujčić, I. Sršen, Sandorf Zagreb)

=== Film ===
- Geniji ali genijalci (Vozny) music,1983
- Ljubezni Blanke Kolak (B.Jujaševič), music, 1986
- Čisto pravi gusar(A.Tomašič), music,1986
- Korak čez (I.Šmid) music Martin Krpan, music,1987
- Nekdo drug, actor,1989
- Halgato (A.Mlakar) actor and music, 1994
- Poredušov Janoš(A.Tomašič), music,1998
- Poj mi pesem (M.Zupanič) bio documentary, 2018
