= List of Slovenian composers =

List of Slovenian composers, arranged in alphabetical order:

== A ==
- France Ačko
- Bojan Adamič
- Emil Adamič
- Jakob Aljaž
- Alojz Ajdič
- Milan Apih
- Blaž Arnič
- Slavko Avsenik
- Slavko Avsenik mlajši

== B ==
- Julije Bajamonti
- Emerik Beran
- Julij Betetto
- Dušan Bavdek
- Janez Bitenc
- Emerik Beran
- Janez Bole
- Lojze Bratuž
- Matija Bravničar
- Lara Baruca

== C ==
- Ciril Cvetko
- Dragotin Cvetko
- Zvonimir Ciglič

== D ==
- Joannes Baptista Dolar

== E ==
- Celestina Ekel

== F ==
- Nenad Firšt
- Nana Forte

== G ==
- Jacobus Gallus
- Fran Gerbič
- Alojz Geržinič
- Vinko Globokar
- Jure Godler
- Jani Golob
- Rok Golob
- Eliza Frančiška Grizold

== H ==
- Milka Hartman
- Marija Hladnik Berden
- Stanko Horvat
- Josipina Eleonora Hudovernik
- Jože Humer

== I ==
- Alojz Ipavec
- Avgust Ipavec
- Josip Ipavec
- Gustav Ipavec
- Benjamin Ipavec
- Amandus Ivančič
- Jure Ivanušič

== J ==
- Tone Janša
- Davorin Jenko
- Jakob Jež

== K ==
- Božidar Kantušer
- Marij Kogoj
- Marjan Kozina
- Uroš Krek
- Aleksander Kogoj

== L ==
- Anton Lajovic
- Dragica Legat Košmerl
- Marijan Lipovšek
- Mihovil Logar

== M ==
- Igor Majcen
- Kašpar Mašek
- Kamilo Mašek
- Janez Matičič
- Pavle Merku
- Adolf Mišek

== N ==
- Johann Baptist Novak

== O ==
- Slavko Osterc

== P ==
- Josip Pavčič
- Jakob Petelin Gallus
- Ivo Petrić
- Isaac Posch (Izak Poš)
- Stanko Prek
- Zorko Prelovec
- Stanko Premrl
- Georg Prenner (tudi Pyrenaeus Brenner)
- Jože Privšek

== R ==
- Primož Ramovš
- Janko Ravnik
- Ivan Rijavec

== S ==
- Milan Sachs
- Risto Savin
- Paul J. Sifler
- George Slatkonia
- Anton Martin Slomšek
- Igor Stuhec
- Minja Subota

== Š ==
- Breda Šček
- Nina Šenk
- Lucijan Marija Škerjanc
- Danilo Švara

== T ==
- Giuseppe Tartini
- Franc Treiber
- Primož Trubar
- Josipina Turnograjska

== V ==
- Josip Vošnjak

== Z ==
- Ivan Zorman

== Ž ==
- Vito Žuraj
