= List of Slovenian musicians =

This is a list of notable Slovene musicians by instrument. For a list of notable popular Slovenian musical groups and artists see List of Slovenian musical artists and groups.

== Accordionists ==
- Vital Ahačič
- Slavko Avsenik
- Bratko Bibič
- Luka Juhart
- Denis Novato
- Nejc Pačnik
- Lojze Slak
- Frank Yankovic

== Flautists ==
- Irena Grafenauer
- Boris Bizjak

== Oboists ==
- Ivo Petrić

== Organists ==
- Lojze Bratuž
- Celestina Ekel
- Eliza Frančiška Grizold
- Marija Hladnik Berden
- Josipina Eleonora Hudovernik
- Antonija Premrov
- Ana Roner Lavrič

== Pianists ==
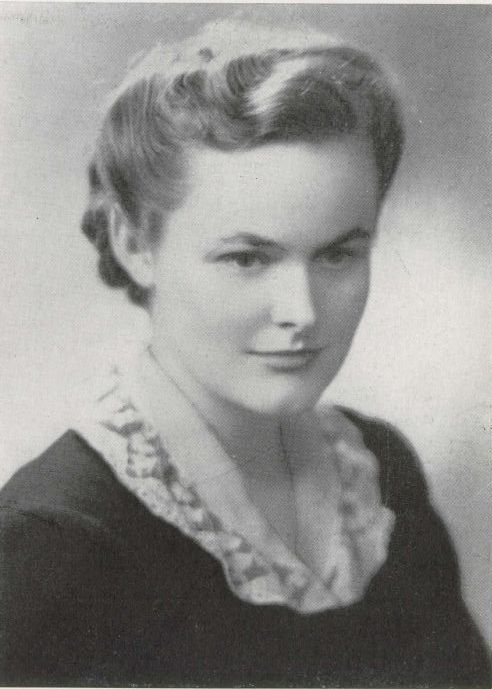
Slovenian pianist Damjana Bratuž (1927-2025)

- Damjana Bratuž
- Bojan Gorišek
- Marijan Lipovšek
- Janez Matičič
- Petar Milić
- Friderika Podgornik
- Janko Ravnik
- Dubravka Tomšič Srebotnjak

== Violinists ==
- Božena Angelova
- Volodja Balžalorsky
- Dejan Bravničar
- Leo Funtek
- Igor Ozim
- Oksana Pečeny
- Lana Trotovšek

== Zither players ==
- Dragica Legat Košmerl

== Other ==
- Dejan Knez
- Krista Povirk
