= Bravničar =

Bravničar is a Slovene surname. Notable people with the surname include:

- Dejan Bravničar (1937–2018), Slovene violinist
- Gizela Bravničar (1908–1990), Slovene ballet dancer
- Matija Bravničar (1897–1977), Slovene composer
