= Zvonimir Ciglič =

Slovenian composer

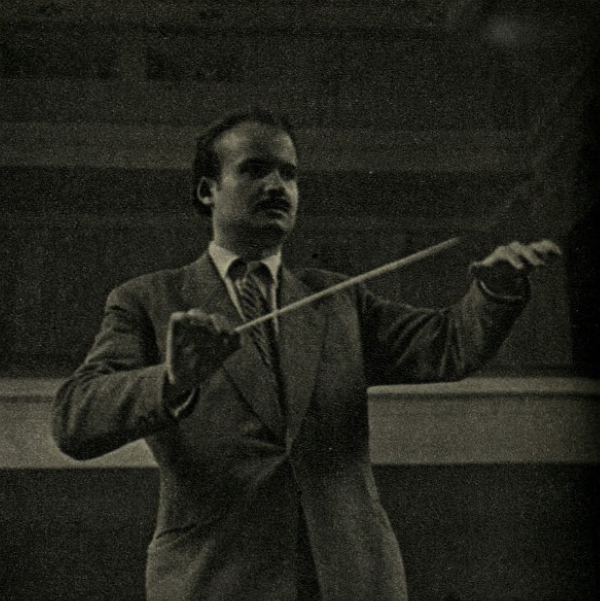
- Zvonimir Ciglič in 1948
- Born: February 20, 1921; Ljubljana, Slovenia Province, Kingdom of Serbs, Croats and Slovenes
- Died: January 21, 2006 (aged 84)
- Occupations: Composer, conductor

Zvonimir Ciglič (February 20, 1921 – January 21, 2006) was a Slovenian composer, conductor and academic teacher.

== Biography ==
Ciglič was born in 1921 in Ljubljana. He was educated at the Ljubljana Academy of Music (to 1948), where he studied with Lucijan Marija Škerjanc and Danilo Švara; later he went to Salzburg where he worked on his conducting with Lovro von Matačić (1957). He was the conductor of the Sarajevo Opera (1948–49) and later held a position at the Lamoureux Orchestra (1958–59). He also taught at the Subotica PO and Music School (1955–56), and later held various positions in Ljubljana.

He died in Golnik in 2006.

== Compositions ==
Ciglič is known for his orchestral music, including three symphonies (1948, 1956), the symphonic poem Obrežje plesalk ("Dancer's Shore"; 1952) and the Harp Concertino (1960). The Harp Concertino is described by Wolfgang Burde as "partly impressionistic and fleecy and partly in the tradition of lean melodiousness cultivated in French orchestral music". He also wrote other instrumental works, as well as choral music and songs. According to Niall O'Loughlin in the composer's entry in Grove Music Online, his influences include Wagner and Debussy.

He has been considered to fall into a "third modern generation" of Slovenian composers who began composing after the Second World War.

== See also ==
- List of Slovenian composers
