= Jakob Jež =

Slovene composer (1928–2022)

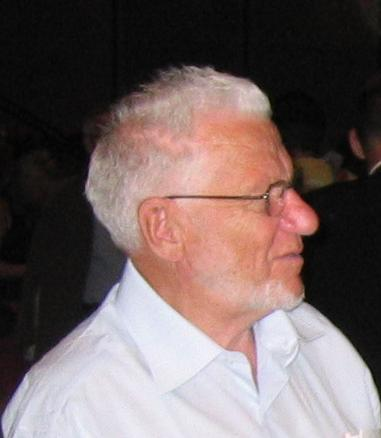
Slovene composer Jakob Jez

Jakob Jež (23 November 1928 – 8 March 2022) was a Slovenian composer.

== Life ==
Jakob Jež was born on 23 November 1928 in Boštanj, a village in eastern Slovenia. In 1954, he graduated from the Academy of Music in Ljubljana, Department of Music History. His dissertation, defended in 1959, focused on the early works of Slovenian composer Marij Kogoj. Kogoj remained a consistent influence for Jež throughout his career.

Although he did not obtain a degree in composition, Jež studied composition with Marijan Lipovský and Karol Pahor. The Lexicon of Yugoslav Music describes his musical style as follows: "By adopting some modern compositional procedures, [Jež] creates a distinctive musical language, full of intimate expressiveness, with a developed sense of colour, lyricism and loose structures - a modern and contemporary language which is never incomprehensibly aggressive."

Jež taught throughout his career, first at a music school and a high school, and then at the Music and Ballet School in Ljubljana (1955–1970). From 1992 until his retirement, he was a full-time professor of music education at the Faculty of Pedagogy in Ljubljana. From 1960 to 1965, he was a member of the composers' group Pro musica viva.

He also served as the editor-in-chief of the music magazines Grlica (1968–1988) and Naši chori (1991–1998), and between 1967 and 1970, he was chief editor of the newsletter Skladatelj (composer), published by the Društvo slovenskih skladateljev (Slovene Composers' Association).

His daughter is composer Brina Jež-Brezavšček, and his granddaughters are flutists Anja Clift and Maruša Brezavšček.

== Awards ==
He received numerous awards for his work, including the first prize of the Federalni Radio for his cantata "Do fraig amors," the Prešeren Fund Prize, the Prešeren Prize for lifetime achievement in composition in 1991, the Kozin Prize for the totality of his choral oeuvre, awarded by the Slovene Composers' Association in 2004, and the Župančič Prize of the Municipality of Ljubljana for lifetime achievement in 2017.
