= Štuhec =

Štuhec is a Slovene surname. Notable people with the surname include:

- Igor Štuhec (born 1932), Slovene composer
- Ilka Štuhec (born 1990), Slovene ski racer
