= Avgust Ipavec =

Slovenian composer (1940–2023)

Avgust Ipavec (2 June 1940 – 3 October 2023) was a Slovenian Roman Catholic priest and composer.

== Biography ==
Ipavec was born at the onset of World War II in Gorizia. In the 1960s, he studied theology at the Faculty of Theology in Ljubljana and was ordained a priest in 1966 in Log pri Vipavi. He graduated from composition at the Academy of Music in Ljubljana in 1974. After graduation, he moved to Vienna to further his musical knowledge, and he then worked there as a hospital priest for almost 50 years. In his free time, he composed works mostly for large ensembles, such as oratorios, symphonies, and cantatas. His major compositions were the Christmas Pastorale; the oratory titled Ad missam in agris ("The Mass in the Field") he wrote for the 900th anniversary of Cistercians in Stična; the only existent mass in four languages titled Missa populorum ("The Mass of the Nations"); and the symphony Colours of the Green Emerald, which premiered in September 2016, dedicated to the memory of the 100th anniversary of World War I. He occasionally visited his house in Bovec.

In December 2006, the Chancellor of Austria awarded Ipavec the Decoration of Merit in Gold of the Republic of Austria for his music, which "connects peoples as music is the only language that crosses the borders and does not need interpreters. His life and work are permeated by a fiery and resounding call for communication between peoples and religions."

Ipavec died in Vienna on 3 October 2023, at the age of 83.

== See also ==
- List of Slovenian composers
