= John La Montaine =

American pianist and composer (1920–2013)

John Maynard La Montaine, also later LaMontaine, (March 17, 1920 – April 29, 2013) was an American pianist and composer, born in Oak Park, Illinois, who won the 1959 Pulitzer Prize for Music for his Piano Concerto No. 1 "In Time of War" (1958), which was premiered by Jorge Bolet.

His teachers included Howard Hanson, Bernard Rogers, and Nadia Boulanger. His works have been performed by Leontyne Price, Jessye Norman, Adele Addison, Donald Gramm, Robert Silverman, Eleanor Steber and Jorge Bolet.

In honor of the American Bicentennial celebration in 1976, he was commissioned to create a choral work for the Penn State Institute for Arts and Humanistic Studies. The opera, entitled Be Glad Then America, was performed by the University Choirs, under the direction of Sarah Caldwell. The folk singer Odetta appeared as the Muse for America.

La Montaine lived in Hollywood, Los Angeles, California. His publishing company, Fredonia Press, is named for the street on which he lived. His business partner was the composer and pianist Paul J. Sifler (1911–2001).

== Selected works ==
Opera

- Novellis, Novellis, a Pageant Opera for narrator, soloists, chorus and orchestra, Op. 31 (1961); libretto adapted by the composer from the Bible, 2 medieval miracle plays, and the Latin liturgy. Premiered December 2, 1962 in Cleveland's Church of the Covenant, followed by performances two days later in New York City's Riverside Church in a Union Theological Seminary production, players included Mac Morgan, Stanley Kole, Maria Di Garlando, Ara Berberian, Charles Bressler, Naomi Farr, and Elaine Bonazzi.
- The Shephardes Playe, a Pagaent Opera for Christmas, Op. 38 (1967); libretto adapted by the composer from 4 medieval Corpus Christi plays; televised in 1968
- Erode the Greate, a Pageant Opera in 2 acts, Op. 40 (1969); libretto adapted by the composer from the Bible, medieval miracle plays, and the Latin liturgy
- Be Glad Then, America, a Decent Entertainment from the Thirteen Colonies, Op. 43 (1974–75); libretto by the composer from historical sources

Orchestral

- Canons, Op. 10a (1965); original version for piano solo
- Recitative, Aria, and Finale for string orchestra, Op. 16a (1965)
- Jubilant Overture, Op. 20 (1959)
- Colloquy for string orchestra, Op. 21 (1965)
- Passacaglia and Fugue for string orchestra, Op. 21a
- Symphony No. 1, Op. 28 (1957)
- Let My Beloved Come into His Garden, Interlude from The Song of Songs, Op. 29a (1965); adapted from the song cycle Fragments from the Song of Songs, Op. 29
- From Sea to Shining Sea, Overture, Op. 30 (1961)
- A Summer's Day, a Sonnet for chamber orchestra, Op. 32 (1962); after a sonnet of William Shakespeare; also arranged for piano
- Canticle, Op. 33 (1965)
- Nightwings (1966)
- Five Sonnets after Shakespeare (1974); original for voice and piano
- Incantation for jazz band, Op. 39 (1968)
- Lexington Green, March "Based on Tunes of William Billings (1746–1800)" for band or orchestra (1974)
- Be Glad Then, America, Overture: an Early American Sampler, Op. 43 (1975); overture to the opera
- Concerto for string orchestra, Op. 51 (1981); based on the String Quartet, Op. 16 (1965)

Concertante

- Concerto No. 1 In Time of War for piano and orchestra, Op. 9 (1958). Premiered by Jorge Bolet and the National Symphony Orchestra under Howard Mitchell.
- Ode for oboe and orchestra, Op. 11 (1952)
- Birds Of Paradise: On the Infinite Efflorescence of Living Things for piano and orchestra, Op. 34 (1964)
- Concerto for flute and orchestra, Op. 48 (1980)
- Symphonic Variations for piano and orchestra, Op. 50 (1982)
- Concerto No. 2 Transformations for piano and orchestra, Op. 55 (1987)
- Concerto No. 3 Children's Games for piano and orchestra (1985)
- Concerto No. 4 for piano and orchestra, Op. 59 (1989)

Chamber and instrumental music

- Sonata for cello and piano, Op. 8 (1950)
- String Quartet, Op. 16 (1965)
- Sonata for flute solo, Op. 24 (1957)
- Quartet for Woodwinds for flute, oboe, clarinet, and bassoon, Op. 24a (1969); melodic material based on the Sonata for flute solo, Op. 24
- Conversations for clarinet (or viola, or violin, or flute, or trombone, or marimba) and piano, Op. 42 (1977)
- Scherzo for 4 trombones (1977)
- 12 Studies for 2 flutes, Op. 46 (1979)
- Canonic Variations for flute and clarinet, Op. 47 (1980)
- 2 Scenes from the Song of Solomon for flute and piano, Op. 49 (1978) or flute and 2 violins, viola, cello, double bass, piano and percussion (1980); adapted from the song cycle Fragments from the Song of Songs, Op. 29

1. Come into My Garden, Interlude
2. My Beloved, Let Us Go Forth

- Sonata for piccolo and piano, Op. 61 (1993)

Organ

- Even Song (1962)
- Processional (1964)
- Of That Hallowed Season, Op. 57 (1954, 1987); adapted from Songs of the Nativity, Op. 13

Piano

- Toccata, Op. 1 (1957)
- Sonata, Op. 3 (1950)
- A Child's Picture Book, Op. 7 (1957)
- Birds (1957)
- Questioning (1957); adapted from Sonata for flute solo
- Sparklers (1957)
- Venice West, Blues (1962)
- 12 Relationships, a Set of Canons, Op. 10 (1965); also orchestrated
- Fuguing Set, Op. 14 (1965)
- 6 Dance Preludes, Op. 18 (1964)
- Sonata for piano 4-hands, Op. 25 (1965)
- Copycats, Canons in 5-Finger Position for the Young Pianist, Op. 26 (1957)
- A Summer's Day, Op. 32a (1962); after a sonnet of William Shakespeare; original version for chamber orchestra
- Jugoslav Dance (1974)
- Sketches for 2 pianos, Op. 56 (1985)
- Variations: Patriotic Thoughts and Much Loved Hymns, Op. 67 (2005)

Vocal

- 4 Songs for high voice, piano, and violin or flute, Op. 2 (1950); words by Johann Wolfgang von Goethe, Ross Rosazza, William Wordsworth and anonymous
- Invocation for medium voice and piano, Op. 4 (1950); words by the composer
- Songs of the Rose of Sharon, Cycle of Songs for soprano and orchestra, Op. 6 (1947); words based on Chapter Two of the Song of Songs. Premiered in 1958 by Leontyne Price and the National Symphony Orchestra under Howard Mitchell.
- Birds' Courting Song, American Folk Song for medium voice and piano (1954)
- A Child's Prayer, Song for medium voice and piano (1956); traditional words
- 5 [6] Sonnets of Shakespeare for voice and piano, Op. 12 (1957); words by William Shakespeare
- Songs of the Nativity, a Cycle of Christmas Songs for medium voice with organ and optional bells, Op. 13a (1954, 1963)
- 3 Poems of Holly Beye for medium voice and piano, Op. 15 (1954); words by Holly Beye
- Fragments from the Song of Songs, Song Cycle for soprano and orchestra, Op. 29 (1959)
- Stopping by Woods on a Snowy Evening for voice and piano (1963); words by Robert Frost
- The Lord Is My Shepherd, Psalm 23 for voice with English horn, harp and string orchestra, Op. 36 No. 2 (1968)
- Wilderness Journal, Symphony [No. 2] for bass-baritone, organ and orchestra, Op. 41 (1970–1971); based on texts from the essays and journals of Henry David Thoreau
- Prayer for Evening for medium voice and organ (1973); words from the Episcopal Book of Common Prayer
- 3 English Folk Songs for voice and piano (1974)
- Black Is the Color of My True Love's Hair for medium voice and piano (2000)

Choral

- Songs of the Nativity, Christmas Anthem for mixed chorus a cappella, Op. 13 (1954)
- Sanctuary, Short Cantata for baritone, mixed chorus and organ, and optional parts for two trumpets and timpani, Op. 17 (1956); words by Theodore S. Ross and Charles Atwood Campbell
- Merry Let Us Part and Merry Meet Again for mixed chorus and piano (1958)
- Nonsense Songs from Mother Goose for mixed chorus and piano, Op. 19
- God of Grace and God of Glory, Short Cantata Based on the Welsh Tune "Cwm Rhondda" for unison choir, children's choir, mixed choir and organ, Op. 22 (1974); words by Harry Emerson Fosdick
- Wonder Tidings, Cycle of Christmas Carols Based on 15th to 17th Century Texts from the British Isles for soprano, alto, tenor, baritone, mixed chorus, harp (or piano), percussion and optional organ, Op. 23 (1964)
- Te Deum for narrator, mixed chorus and wind orchestra, Op. 35 (1963–1964)
- The Earth Is the Lord's, Psalm 24 for mixed chorus and string orchestra, Op. 36 No. 1 (1968)
- Missa naturae (Mass of Nature) for narrator, mixed chorus and orchestra, Op. 37 (1966)
- Freedom Proclamation, Anthem for soloists, mixed chorus, organ, handbell in G and optional guitar (1975)
- The Nine Lessons of Christmas for soloists, mixed chorus, harp and small percussion instruments, Op. 44 (1975)
- The Whittier Service, 9 Hymn-Anthems to Texts by John Greenleaf Whittier for chorus, guitar and organ, Op. 45 (1979)
- The Lessons of Advent for soloists, narrator, double chorus, handbell choir, trumpet, drums, harp, oboe, guitar, and organ, Op. 52 (1983)
- The Marshes of Glynn for bass, chorus and orchestra, Op. 53 (1984); words by Sidney Lanier
- We Can Get Along for children's chorus (treble voices) and piano (2003); words by Azell Taylor
- Holiday Greeting for mixed chorus
