= Otavice =

Otavice may refer to:

- Otavice, Croatia, a small village in the Dalmatian hinterland in Croatia
- Otavice, Slovenia, a small village in the Municipality of Ribnica, Slovenia
