= Ahačič =

Ahačič is a Slovene surname. Notable people with the surname include:

- Draga Ahačič (1924–2023), Slovene actress, film director, translator, and publicist
- Vital Ahačič (1933–1995), Slovene accordionist
