= Nada Ludvig-Pečar =

Bosnian composer (1929–2008)

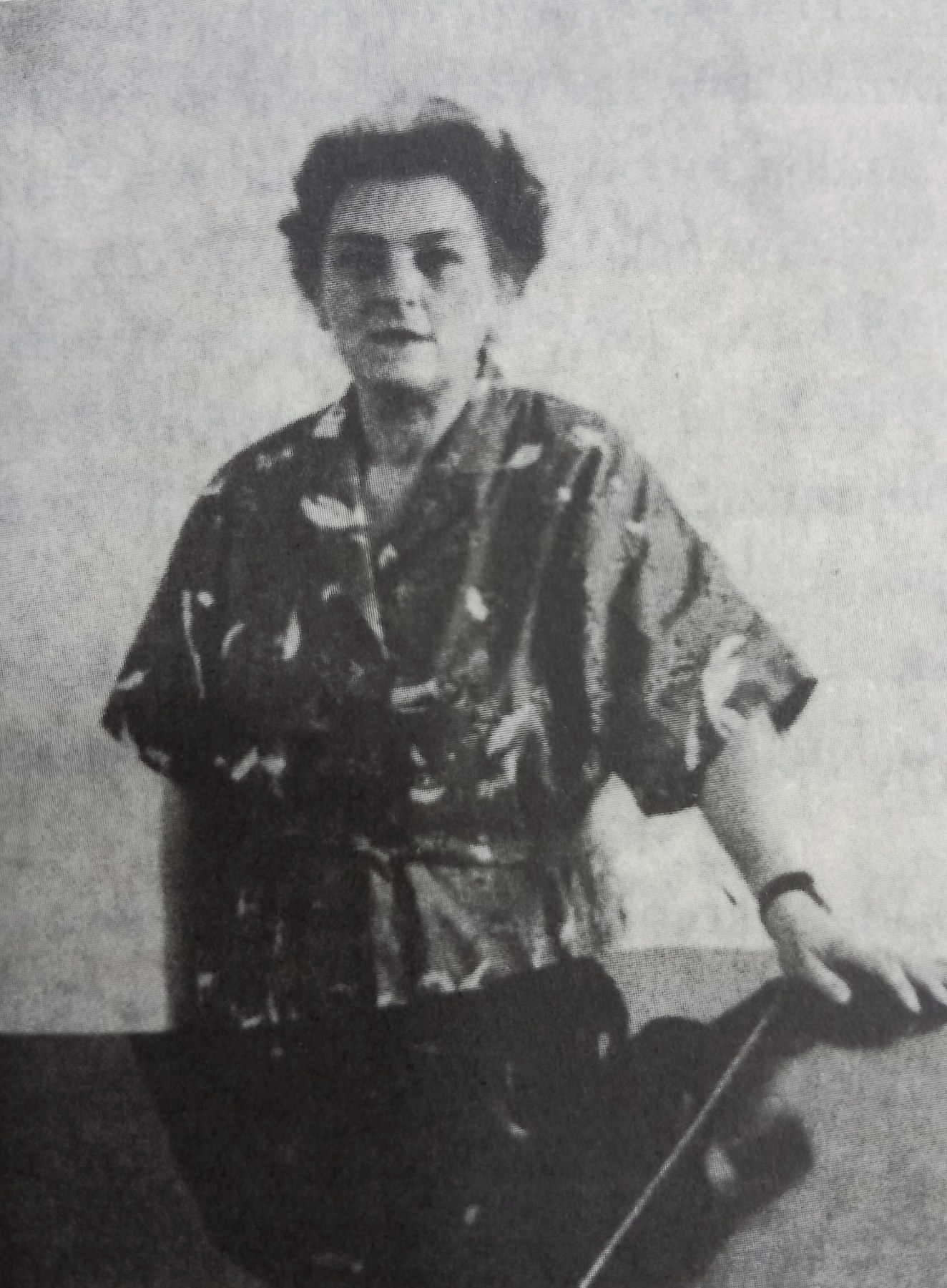
- Born: 12 May 1929; Sarajevo, Kingdom of Yugoslavia
- Died: 31 March 2008 (aged 78); Vienna, Austria

Nada Ludvig-Pečar (12 May 1929 – 31 March 2008) was a Bosnian composer. Some of her most well-known works include Deset studija (1965), String Quartet in D (1966), Suita hexatonica (1973) and Sappho (1974). She was also the chairperson of the Composers Association of Bosnia and Herzegovina in 1981 and 1982.

== Early life and education ==
Nada Ludvig-Pečar was born on 12 May 1929 in Sarajevo. She began her music education at the Music School in Sarajevo in 1939, then continued her studies at the Department for Music Theory and Music Education at the Music High School in Sarajevo from 1945. In 1955, she started studying conducting in Mladen Pozajić's class at the Sarajevo Academy of Music, and then in Lucijan Marija Škerjanc's composition class at the Academy of Music, Ljubljana from 1957. She graduated from there in 1962, and also received her master's degree there in 1966.

== Career ==
After graduating from the Music High School, Ludvig-Pečar began work as a piano teacher at the Primary Music School. Ludvig-Pečar worked as a music editor at TV Sarajevo between 1965 and 1966. She also lectured at the Sarajevo Academy of Pedagogy.

Among her successful compositions include the chamber works are a violin suite in 1965 and String Quartet in D in 1966, while her most successful on solo piano include Deset studija (Ten Studies) in 1965 and Suita hexatonica in 1973.

Beginning in 1969 she taught music theory at the Sarajevo Music Academy, where she worked until she retired in 1989. She also served as the chairman of the Composers Association of Bosnia and Herzegovina between 1981 and 1982.

== Later life and death ==
Ludvig-Pečar spent the last few years of her life living in Vienna. She died there on 31 March 2008, at the age of 78.
