= Bojan Gorišek =

Slovenian pianist

- Born: June 6, 1962 (age 62); Celje, Slovenia
- Occupation: Pianist
- Website: bojangorisek.com

Bojan Gorišek (born June 6, 1962) is a Slovenian pianist.

== Education and career ==
Gorišek studied under the tutelage of Aci Bertoncelj at the Academy of Music of the University of Ljubljana, from which he graduated in 1986. He later studied in Cologne. His concert repertoire primarily consists of works by 20th and 21st-century composers. Among his recordings is the entire piano opus of Erik Satie. He has also premiered works by Slovenian composers such as Milko Lazar.

As of 2019, Gorišek has been interpreting works by American composer Philip Glass.

== Awards ==
- Župančič Award, 2019
- Prešeren Award, 2006

== See also ==
List of Slovenian musicians
