= Dragotin Cvetko =

Slovenian composer (1911–1993)

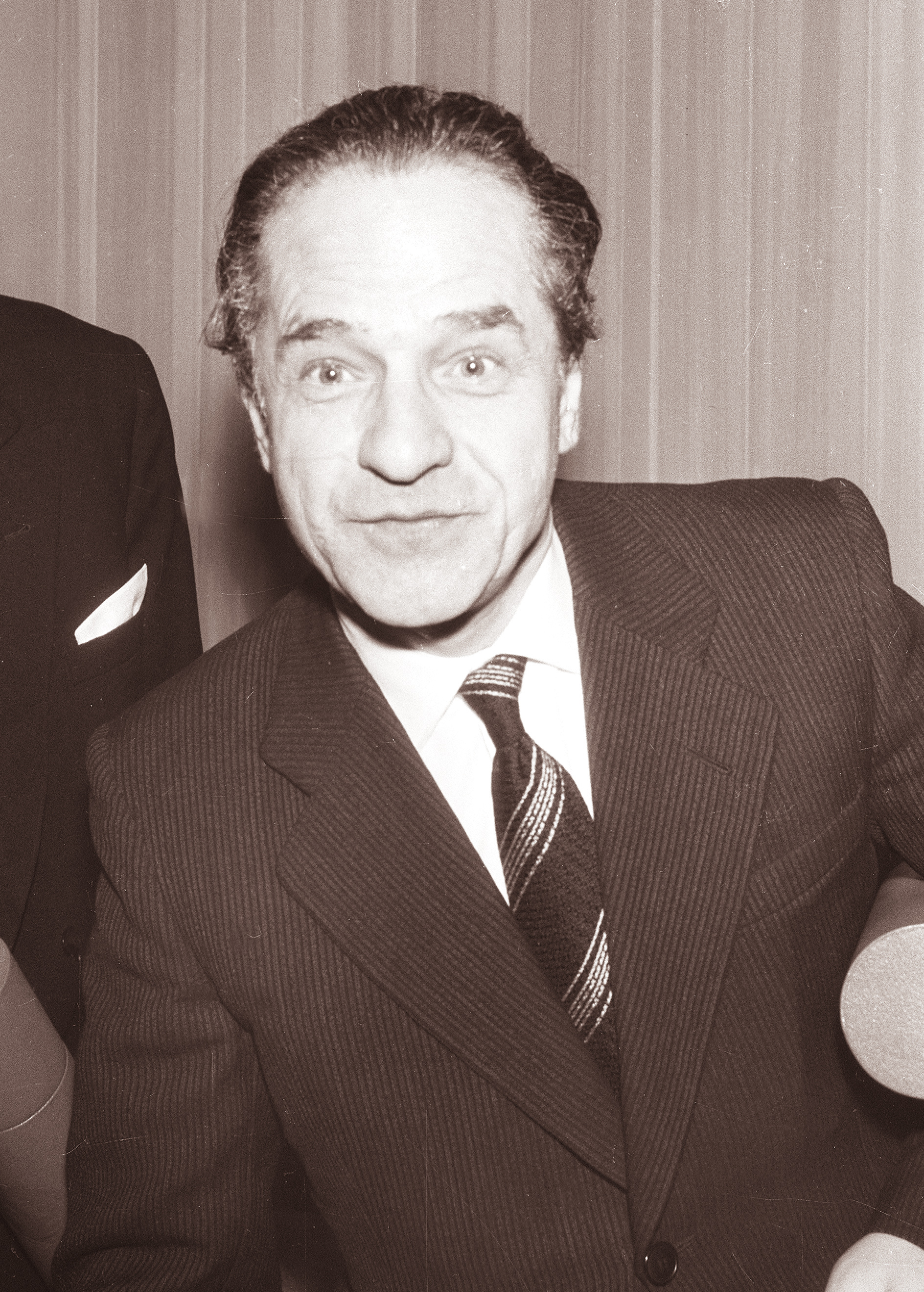
- Cvetko in 1961
- Born: 19 September 1911; Vučja Vas, Duchy of Styria, Austria-Hungary
- Died: 12 December 1993 (aged 82); Ljubljana, Slovenia
- Education: University of Ljubljana
- Occupations: Composer, musicologist
- Awards: Prešeren Award (1961); Herder Prize (1972)

Dragotin Cvetko (19 September 1911 – 2 September 1993) was a Slovenian composer and musicologist.

== Early life and education ==
Dragotin Cvetko was born in Vučja Vas, a village in Styria, Austria-Hungary. He was the son of Fran and Alojzija Cvetko, both schoolteachers in Vučja Vas, and the older brother of the composer Ciril Cvetko (1920–1999). He studied at the Faculty of Arts at the University of Ljubljana (graduating in 1936) and at the Ljubljana Conservatory (graduating in 1937), and continued his education in composition in Prague. He received his doctorate in 1938 with the dissertation Problem občega muzikalnega vzgajanja ter izobraževanja (The Problem of General Music Education).

== Second World War ==
During the Second World War, he served as a delegate at the Assembly of the Delegates of the Slovenian Nation in Kočevje. From 1944 to 1945 he was a committee member of the Research Institute of the Liberation Front of the Slovenian Nation, the main role of which was to research and define the postwar borders of Slovenia. After the war, on 24 July 1946, he married Nives Polak and they had one son and two daughters. In 1947, their daughter Varja, a later prominent linguist, was born to them.

== Academic career ==
He taught at the Academy of Music in Ljubljana from 1938 to 1943 and from 1945 to 1962 with the ranks of assistant, associate, and full professor. From 1962 to 1981 he was a professor of the history of Slovenian and modern world music and the head of the Department of Musicology at the University of Ljubljana's Faculty of Arts. He served as the dean of the Faculty of Arts from 1970 to 1972. In 1982 the University of Ljubljana awarded him the title of distinguished professor. He was the vice president of the International Musicological Society (1967–1972). He became a full member of the Slovenian Academy of Sciences and Arts in 1970, a corresponding member of the Serbian Academy of Sciences and Arts in 1968, a corresponding member of the Croatian Academy of Sciences and Arts in 1979, and an honorary member of the Croatian Music Institute in 1978. He received the Prešeren Award in 1961 for his work Zgodovino glasbene umetnosti na Slovenskem (History of Music in Slovenia), the Herder Prize in 1972, the AVNOJ Award in 1982, and the Kidrič Award in 1988.

He research initially focused on issues of music theory and education, but soon after 1945 he started focusing on music history. He engaged in extensive work based on critical study of sources and issues of musical style to create a solid basis for Slovenian music history, providing an impetus for similar work elsewhere in Yugoslavia. His critical editions of compositions are of exceptional importance; they were the first of their kind in Slovenia (e.g., Skladatelji Gallus, Plautzius, Dolar in njihovo delo, 1963; J. Gallus Carniolus, Harmoniale morales, 1966; J. Gallus Carniolus, Moralia, 1968). He published numerous articles in Yugoslav and international periodicals. He participated in international musicological conferences and delivered talks at various universities and institutions, and also in radio broadcasts.

The Department of Musicology was founded at the University of Ljubljana's Faculty of Arts in 1962 as a result of his efforts. In 1965 he started publishing the journal Muzikološki zbornik (Musicological Proceedings), which included contributions from Yugoslavia and abroad. In 1972 he founded the SAZU Institute of Musicology, which began operating in 1980.

He died in Ljubljana at the age of 82 years. On 18 September 2011, a bust of him was unveiled in his native village of Vučja Vas.

== Selected bibliography ==
- Problem občega muzikalnega vzgajanja ter izobraževanja (The Problem of General Music Education; Ljubljana, 1938) COBISS 89575680
- Život i rad kompozitora Rista Savina (The Life and Work of Risto Savin; Belgrade, 1958) COBISS 1816605
- Zgodovina glasbene umetnosti na Slovenskem (This History of Music in Slovenia; Ljubljana, 1958–1960) COBISS 2160129
- (with Josip Andreis and Stana Đurić-Klajn) Historijski razvoj muzičke kulture u Jugoslaviji (The Historical Develiopment of Musical Culture in Yugoslavia; Zagreb, 1962) COBISS 2971649
- Academia Philharmonicorum Labacensis (Ljubljana, 1962) COBISS 24257025
- Stoletja slovenske glasbe (Centuries of Slovenian Music; Ljubljana, 1964) COBISS 20106496
- Jacobus Gallus Carniolus (Ljubljana, 1965) COBISS 3742209
- Jacobus Gallus: sein Leben und Werk (The Life and Work of Jacobus Gallus; Munich, 1972) COBISS 69640
- Musikgeschichte der Südslawen (Music History of the South Slavs; Kassel, 1975) COBISS 27805441
- Davorin Jenko (Ljubljana, 1980) COBISS 15717888
- Južni Slovani v zgodovini evropske glasbe (The South Slavs in the History of European Music; Maribor, 1981) COBISS 7351296
- Glasbeni svet Antona Lajovca = Anton Lajovic und seine Musikwelt (The Musical World of Anton Lajovic; Ljubljana, 1985) COBISS 1769473
- Anton Lajovic (Ljubljana, 1987) COBISS 5228800
- Iacobus Hándl Gallus vocatus Carniolanus (Ljubljana, 1991) COBISS 22783488
- Slovenska glasba v evropskem prostoru = Slovenian Music in Its European setting (Ljubljana, 1991) COBISS 23768832
- V prostoru in času: spomini (In Space and Time: Memories; Ljubljana, 1995) COBISS 53365248

== See also ==
- List of Slovenian composers
