= Igor Štuhec =

Slovenian composer (1932–2024)

Igor Štuhec (15 December 1932 – September 2024) was a contemporary Slovenian composer, who lived in Ljubljana and Maribor. He studied composition at the Ljubljana Academy of Music under Lucijan Marija Škerjanc and Matija Bravničar. He continued his studies at the Vienna Academy of Music and Dramatic Art under Hanns Jelinek, and also at the Darmstädter Ferienkurse. After some early neo-classical orchestral works that show his mastery of traditional techniques, Štuhec gradually moved towards the adoption of new techniques in the early 1960s. Although in 1955 he had produced a musique concrète composition in Biological Transformation, the radical change came with the chamber pieces Situacija (1963) and Silhuete (1964) and the orchestral Differentiations (1964), all of which exhibit his assimilation of 12-note and aleatory procedures. Štuhec's skill is particularly evident in miniatures such as the Minikoncert, where his writing is at its most delicate and the textures are almost always crystal clear. A later group of orchestral works extending his textural techniques, notably the concertos and the three Entuziazmi pieces, display a vivid imagination and a strong rhythmic momentum. Also among his works are two operas, Zupanova Micka (1948) and Moon Dawn (1973). He was a winner of the Prešeren Prize.

== Sources ==
- Today in History Archives
