= In the Kingdom of the Goldhorn =

1931 film

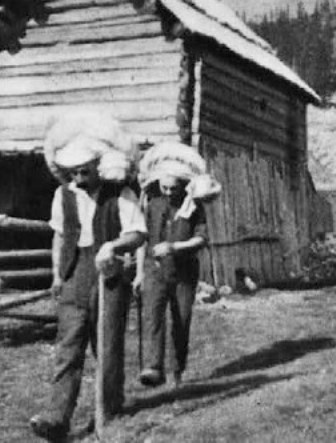
Scene from the film

In the Kingdom of the Goldhorn (Slovene: V kraljestvu Zlatoroga) was the first Slovene feature film. It was filmed in 1928 and 1929 and was directed, shot, and edited by Janko Ravnik. It was a black-and-white silent film. The film was produced by the Skala mountain hiking club, and was 107 minutes long. Only about two-thirds of the original 31-millimetre (1.2 in) film (i.e., a shortened 76-minute version) is preserved today.

The screenplay was written by Juš Kozak. The story tells about a trip by a student, a railway worker, and a peasant to the Julian Alps, the people they meet on their way, and their ascent to Triglav. The film features the mountaineers Joža Čop (Roban) and Miha Potočnik (Klemen).

In the Kingdom of the Goldhorn was released on 29 August 1931 at the Grand Hotel Union in Ljubljana. It was well received by the public but faulted in reviews as amateurish. The last time the film was shown to the general public was on its 80th anniversary at the Grand Hotel Union in August 2011. A commemorative stamp was released by the Post of Slovenia on this occasion; it depicts Janko Ravnik shooting film with the actor Herbert Drofenik sitting next to the camera.

== See also ==
- The Slopes of Triglav, the second Slovene feature film (1932)
- On Our Own Land, the first Slovene sound feature film (1948)
