= Janez Bole =

Slovenian composer

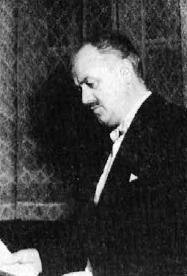
Janez Bole

Janez Bole (March 7, 1919 in Brezje, Radovljica – February 21, 2007 in Ljubljana) was a Slovenian music pedagogue, choirmaster and composer.

== See also ==
- List of Slovenian composers
