= Pavel Šivic =

Slovene composer (1908–1995)

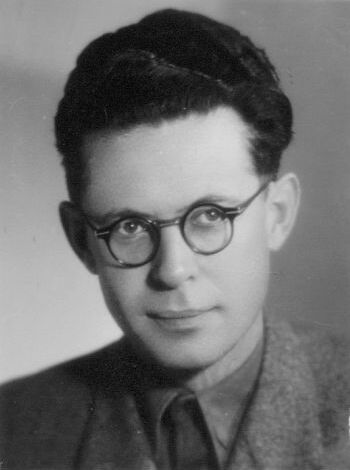
Pavel Šivic

Pavel Šivic (born February 2, 1908, in Radovljica, Slovenia — died May 31, 1995, in Ljubljana) was a Slovenian composer, concert pianist, and music educator. He is primarily known for his stage works, which include the music for five operas, an operetta, and a ballet; all of which premiered at the Ljubljana Opera House. His 1974 opera Cortesova vrnitev (The Return of Cortes), is widely regarded as the finest achievement in the genre by a Slovenian composer and in Slovenian. Šivic wrote the libretto to this opera himself, which is based on the 1967 play of the same name by Andrej Hieng. Šivic also composed a twelve-tone suite, several cantatas, choral works, vocal art songs, solo instrument pieces for a variety of instruments including many for the piano, and multiple film scores.

Šivic graduated from the Ljubljana Conservatory in 1931 where he was a pupil of Janko Ravnik (piano) and Slavko Osterc (composition). He pursued graduate studies at the Prague Conservatory in 1933 with Vilém Kurz (piano), Josef Suk (composition) and Alois Hába (composition and music theory). From 1939 until 1978 he taught composition on the faculty of the Academy of Music in Ljubljana. He was also active as concert pianist and accompanist in Ljubljana; contributing greatly to the music life of that city. He was given the Prešeren Award in 1965.

== Partial list of works ==
- Oj, ta prešmentana ljubezen [Oh, that Cursed Love] (operetta in 3 Acts, libretto by M. Simončič); 29 April 1931
- Dogodek v mestu Gogi [An Event in the Town of Goga] (ballet), 1967
- Cortesova vrnitev [The Return of Cortés], 1971 (opera in 3 Acts, libretto by Šivic, after A. Hieng); 20 March 1974
- Svitanje [The Daybreak] (opera in 1 Act, libretto by Šivic, after B. Šömen); 10 May 1979
- Samorog [The Unicorn] (opera in 3 Acts, libretto by Šivic, after G. Strniša), 1981
- Kaznovana radovednost [Curiosity Punished] (Children's opera in 1 Act, libretto by Šivic and V. Rudolph); 9 February 1988
- Hiša iz kart (opera), 1989
