= Mirca Župnek Sancin =

Slovene composer and piano teacher

- Born: Mirca Župnek; 3 March 1901
- Died: 24 July 1970 (aged 69)
- Occupations: piano teacher, composer

Mirca Župnek Sancin (3 March 1901 – 24 July 1970) was a Slovene composer and piano teacher.

She was born in Ljubljana to Ana Petric and Franc Župnek. She studied composition at the Graz Conservatory (today the University of Music and Performing Arts Graz). Her teachers included Ivan Brezovšek, Hans Schmidt, and Lucijan Marija Škerjanc. In addition to composing, she taught pano in Celje and Ljubljana, and at the State Higher Teachers' College in Trieste. She married Ivan Karel Sancin, and they had one son.

Her music was published by the Ljubljana Music Society.

== Selected works ==
=== Chamber ===
- Peasant Dance (chamber orchestra; originally for piano)
- Vision and Romance (violin and piano)

=== Piano ===
- Fantastično koto
- Improvizacija No. 1 and 2
- Iz mladih dni
- Komar i muha
- Koračnica
- Mali plesni impromptu
- Mladinska igra
- Miniature
- Na igrišču
- On the Field
- Peasant Dance (also arranged for chamber orchestra)
- Pleši, pleši kosmatinec (Dance, Dance My Bear)
- Pomladni valček
- Preludij
- Reovje
- Romansa
- Scherzoso
- Silhuette
- Six Clavichord Compositions for Youth
- Slavnostna koračnica
- Španski ples
- Twenty Technical Exercises
- Uspavanka
- Valse campestre
- Vesela mladina

=== Vocal ===
- "Begunka"
- "Ljubavna pesem"
- "Med nama je vse polno zlatih niti"
- "Mene ni požela kosa" (text by Alojz Gradnik)
- "Momentek" (text by Josip Murn)
- Nesreča
- Pomlad je prišla (lyrics by Oton Župančič)
- Rosica
- Tih večer
- Trenutek
