= Karel Rupel =

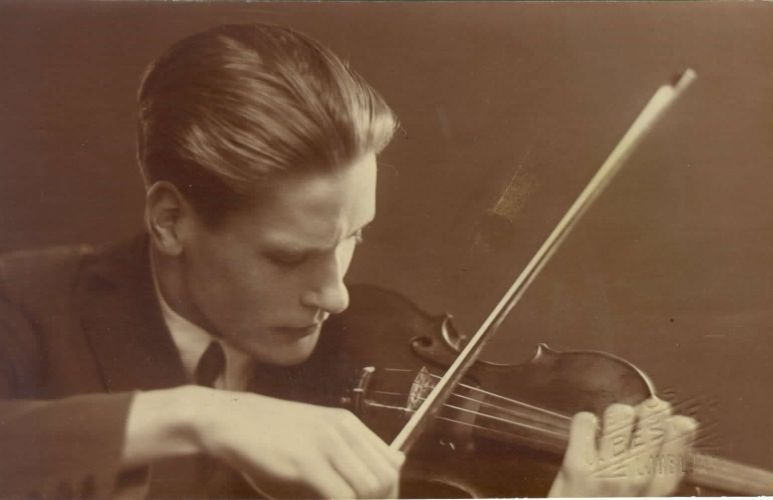
Karel Rupel

Karel Rupel also Karlo Rupel (5 December 1907 in Trieste – 17 September 1968 in Ljubljana) was a Slovenian violinist and professor of the Ljubljana Academy of Music.
