= Paul J. Sifler =

Slovenian composer and conductor

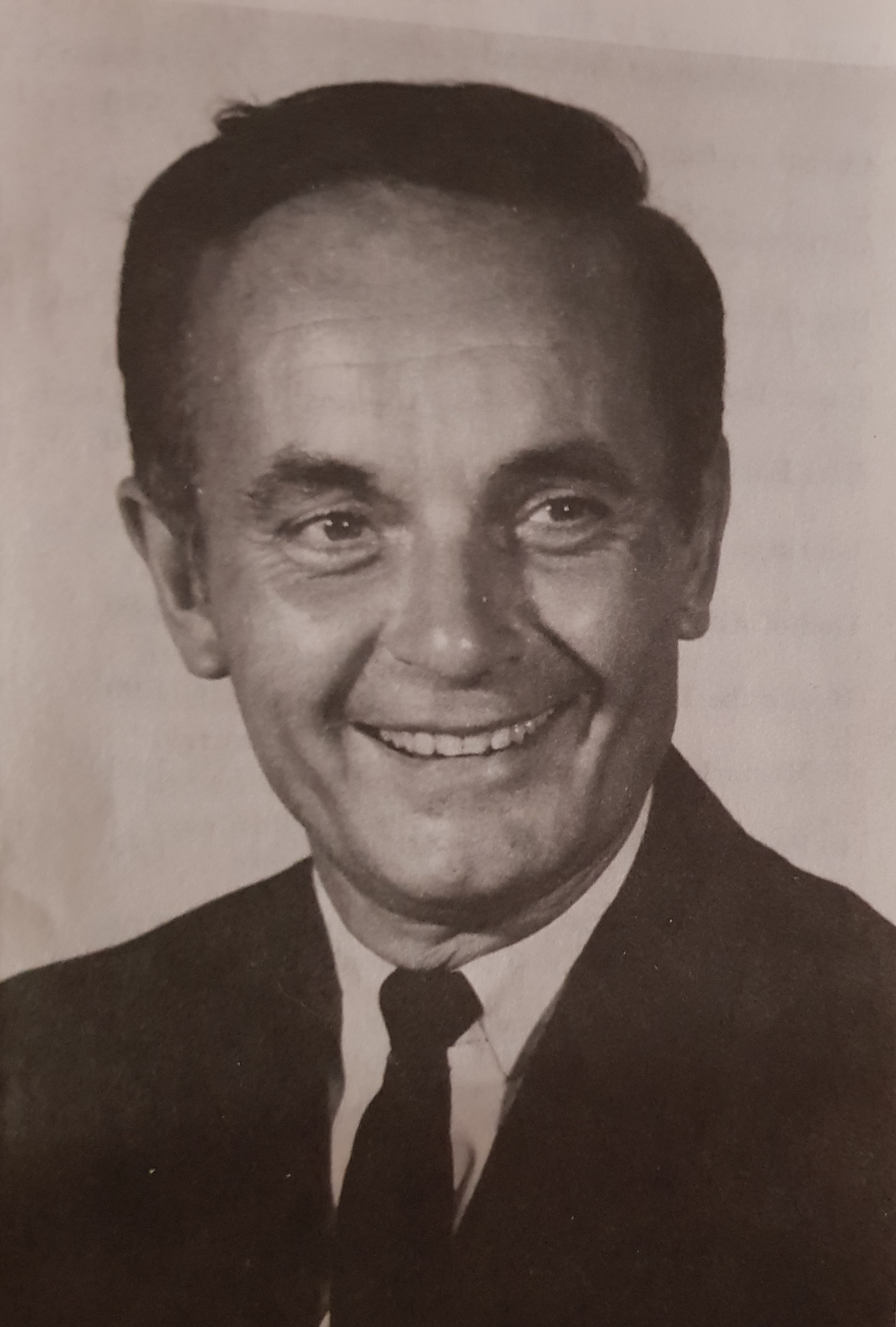
Paul J. Sifler (1911–2001)

Paul John Sifler (born Pavel Gerjol, December 31, 1911, Ljubljana, Slovenia – May 20, 2001, Hollywood, California, was a Slovenian composer and conductor.

== Biography ==
Paul J. Sifler was the illegitimate son of the organ builder Ivan Kacin (1884–1953) and a young singer, Terezija Gerjol. His surname was changed to Šifler when he was adopted by his stepfather and was later modified to Sifler. At the age of 11, he moved to the United States from his native Polhov Gradec.

He attended the Chicago Conservatory of Music and graduated in 1940 with a degree in music composition. Sifler was an extremely prolific composer, and he is best known for his works for the organ. Many of his other titles, such as his "Slovenian Triptych for Piano" and "Three Preludes on Slovene Church Hymns" relate back his native Slovenia. In 1975, together with Pulitzer Prize-winning composer John La Montaine, Paul Sifler founded Fredonia Press, for the purpose of publishing exclusively the works of the two composers.

Until his death in 2001, Sifler lived and worked with La Montaine in Hollywood on Fredonia Drive, from which they derived the name of their publishing company.

== Selected works ==
- Organ:
  - The Despair and Agony of Dachau
  - Four Slovene Rhapsodies
  - Three Liturgical Preludes
  - Prayer for Peace
  - Four Nativity Tableaux
  - Improvisation on a Joyful Song ("Zdravljica")
- Piano:
  - Concerto for Piano and Orchestra
  - Three Tall Tales
  - The Young Pianist's Almanac
  - American Dance Rhapsody
  - Martian Suite
  - Triptych on Slovenian Folk Songs
- Instrumental:
  - Three Miniatures for marimba
  - Suite for marimba dedicated to Karen Pershing
  - Sonatina for marimba
  - Triptych for Violin and Piano
  - Hill Tune and Dance for Flute and Oboe
- Choral:
  - Three Puerto Rican Carols for two-part chorus with piano (organ) accompaniment and optional percussion
  - On This Night for mixed voices with soprano or tenor solo and optional flute obbligato.
  - A Tune I'd Like to Play for You (Jaz 'mam pa nekaj novega) for SATB voices with piano accompaniment.
  - Snow is Melting (Sneg kopni) for SATB voices
  - Marimba Mass for SATB chorus, triangle & marimba

== See also ==
- List of Slovenian composers
- Polhov Gradec
