= Marijan Lipovšek =

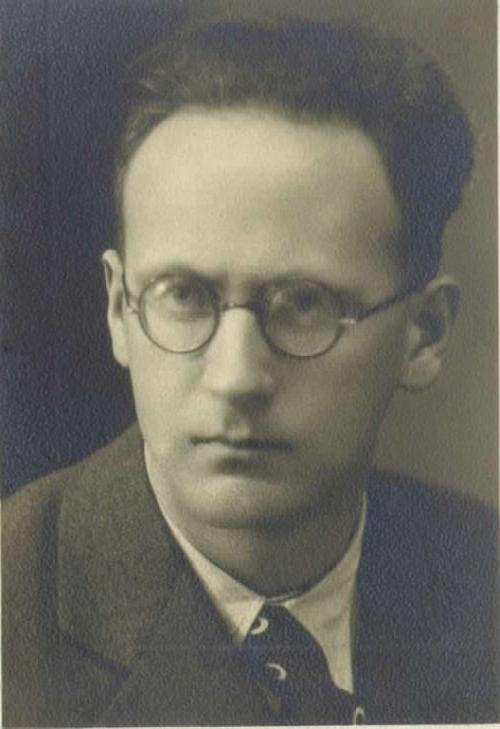
- Marijan Lipovšek in 1938
- Born: 26 January 1910; Ljubljana, Austria-Hungary
- Died: 25 December 1995 (aged 85)
- Occupations: Composer; Pianist; Teacher

Marijan Lipovšek (Ljubljana 26 January 1910 – 25 December 1995) was a Slovenian composer, pianist, and teacher.

A native of Ljubljana, he studied music in that city before heading to Prague in 1932; among his teachers were Pavel Šivic, Josef Suk, and Alois Hába. He later taught at the Ljubljana Academy of Music. He was father of the mezzo-soprano Marjana Lipovšek.

== See also ==
- List of Slovenian composers
