= Vučja Vas =

- Location in Slovenia
- Coordinates: 46°35′51.61″N 16°6′5.79″E
- Country: Slovenia
- Traditional region: Styria
- Statistical region: Mura
- Municipality: Križevci

Area
  - Total: 4.67 km^{2} (1.80 sq mi)
- Elevation: 193.2 m (634 ft)

Population (2002)
  - Total: 234

Vučja Vas (pronounced [ˈʋuːtʃja ˈʋaːs]; Slovene: Vučja vas, in older sources Vučja ves, German: Wolfsdorf) is a village in the Municipality of Križevci in northeastern Slovenia. It lies on the regional road from Ljutomer to Radenci. The area is part of the traditional region of Styria. The municipality is now included in the Mura Statistical Region.

A small Neo-Gothic chapel in the settlement was totally rebuilt in 1986 on the site and in the style of an older chapel dating to 1876.

== Notable people ==
Notable people that were born or lived in Vučja Vas include:

- Ciril Cvetko (1920–1999), composer and conductor
- Dragotin Cvetko (1911–1993), musicologist
