= Junsang Bahk =

South Korean composer (born 1937)

- Hangul: 박준상
- Hanja: 朴俊相
- RR: Bak Junsang
- MR: Pak Chunsang

Junsang Bahk (Korean: 박준상; born 2 June 1937) is a Korean composer, also active in Austria.

== Biography ==
Bahk studied composition at the Graduate School, Seoul National University, where he received a Master of Music Degree in 1965. An Austrian government stipend enabled him to study composition from 1967 to 1973 at the Universität für Musik und darstellende Kunst in Vienna, with Hanns Jelinek and Alfred Uhl, twelve-tone technique with Jelinek and Erich Urbanner, electronic music and modern music with Friedrich Cerha. He graduated with Distinction in 1973. In 1968 and 1970 he took part in the Internationale Ferienkurse für Neue Musik in Darmstadt, in Karlheinz Stockhausen's composition studios, and later in György Ligeti's composition seminar. Subsequently, he studied musicology and ethnomusicology at the University of Vienna, where he received a Ph.D. in 1991 with a dissertation titled "Die Auswirkungen der Volksliedforschung auf das kompositorische Schaffen von Béla Bartók".

In 1969 in Seoul, together with Isang Yun, Nam June Paik, and Sukhi Kang, he helped organize the "Biennale for Contemporary Music", where new Western music was performed for the first time in Korea (Stockhausen, Pierre Boulez, Herbert Eimert, John Cage, Roman Haubenstock-Ramati, etc.).

His compositions have won many important prizes, including the Korean National Prize for Composition (1980), First Prize of the Korean Information Ministry (1964), and the Kompositionspreis des Grazer Musikprotokolls (1973 and 1975).

== Works (selective list) ==
- Symphony No. 1 for grand orchestra (1965)
- Mark for piano (1971)
- Seak I for chamber ensemble (1971)
- Echo for wind quintet (flute, oboe, clarinet, bassoon, horn)
- Invokation for dancing soprano, bass clarinet, and percussion (1977)
- Chunhyang Chon (The Tale of the Maiden Chunhyang), opera, to a libretto by the composer (1985)
- Sublim for orchestra (1987)
- String Quartet No. 1 (2000)
- Coreana, Symphony for string orchestra (2003)
- Trans-Danza (Utdari Pungmul) for violin and piano (2005)
- Mozartiana for violin and piano (2006)
- Dokdo Symphony for orchestra (2009)
- Pastoral Concerto for flute and orchestra (2017)
- Mantra, Concerto for piano and orchestra (2018)
- Children's World for chamber orchestra (2020)
- Manpasikjeok(만파식적/萬波息笛), Concerto for daegeum and Korean traditional orchestra (2020)
- Symphony No. 3 for orchestra (2021)

== General references ==
- Dibelius, Ulrich (ed.). 1998. "Junsang Bahk". In Moderne Musik nach 1945. Mit 75 Abbildungen und 87 Notenbeispielen. Munich, Zürich: Piper, 1998. ISBN 3-492-04037-3
- Die Musik in Geschichte und Gegenwart, Allgemeine Enzyklopädie der Musik begründet von Friedrich Blume, vol. 5. Kassel, London, New York: Baerenreiter.
