= Ciril Cvetko =

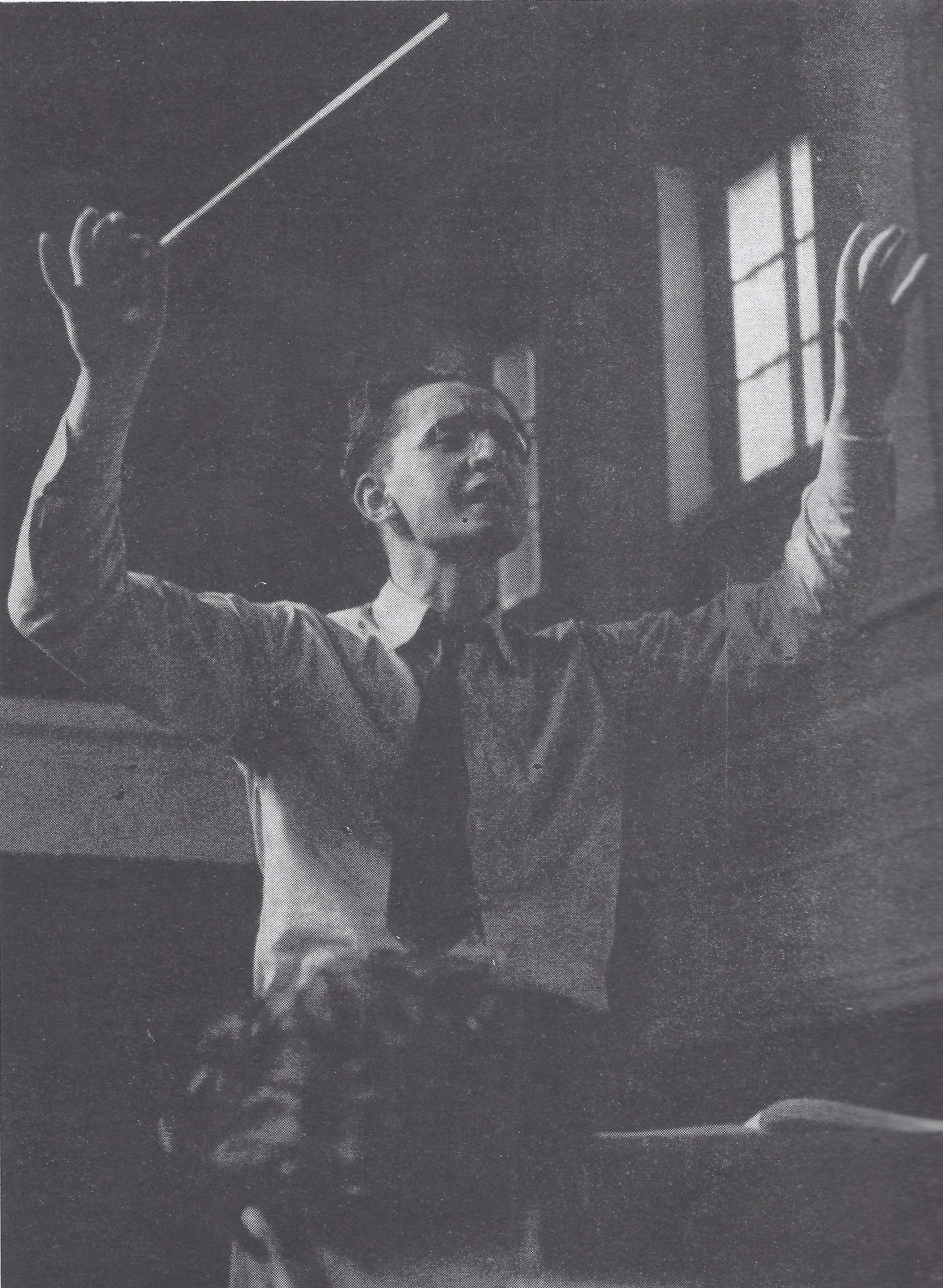
- Born: 8 January 1920; Vučja Vas, Slovenia
- Died: 18 January 1999 (aged 79); Ljubljana, Slovenia
- Known for: composer, conductor
- Awards: Levstik Award; 1963 for Opera in njeni mojstri

Ciril Cvetko (8 January 1920 – 18 January 1999) was a Slovene composer and conductor, brother of the musicologist Dragotin Cvetko.

== Biography ==
Cvetko was born in Vučja Vas near Ljutomer in northeastern Slovenia in 1920. He studied music at the Ljubljana Academy of Music and graduated in 1948. He also completed graduate studies in Prague and Paris. He worked at Triglav Film, the Slovene National Theatre Opera and Ballet Company, and the Slovenian Philharmonic Orchestra.

He died in Ljubljana in 1999.

In 1963 he won the Levstik Award for his book Opera in njeni mojstri (The Opera and Its Masters).
