= Otavice, Ribnica =

Otavice
- Location in Slovenia
- Coordinates: 45°43′44.44″N 14°45′54.9″E
- Country: Slovenia
- Traditional region: Lower Carniola
- Statistical region: Southeast Slovenia
- Municipality: Ribnica

Area
  - Total: 5.51 km^{2} (2.13 sq mi)
- Elevation: 483.1 m (1,585 ft)

Population (2002)
  - Total: 107
- Postal code: 1310

Otavice (pronounced [ɔˈtaːʋitsɛ]; German: Otawitz) is a village southeast of the town of Ribnica in southern Slovenia. The area is part of the traditional region of Lower Carniola and is now included in the Southeast Slovenia Statistical Region. It includes the hamlet of Ograda southeast of the main settlement.

== Geography ==
Otavice is a ribbon village below the Little Mountains (Slovene: Mala gora) chain in the eastern part of the Ribnica Valley (Slovene: Ribniška dolina). The nearby forests are rich in linden and fir, which has led to their use for bee forage. The Sela meadows lie west of the settlement, the Rupče hay fields to the east, and the sparse Stevniki oak woods to the north. The soil is stony and sandy, making potatoes a principal crop, but crop damage by deer has led to many fields being planted in clover. Coniferous and mixed woods rise above the village on Little Mountain. Bršljunovka Cave on Little Mountain is fed by a spring.

== Name ==
Otavice was mentioned in written sources in 1340 as Ottawnich (and as Ottawnikch and Ottownikch in 1436). The name Otavice is probably derived from the Slovene common noun otava 'second crop (of hay)', referring to a meadow where hay could be harvested twice during the summer. In the past, the settlement was known as Otawitz in German.

== History ==
The remnants of a Roman road pass near the village, attesting to early settlement in the area. Oral tradition relates that there are Ottoman graves in Tur Field (Slovene: Turjevo polje) at the foot of Little Mountain. A water main was installed in the village in 1960, supplying water from Obrh Spring near Blate via Goriča Vas. Traditional handicrafts in the village included making rakes with wood from Kočevje Rog. Peddling declined in the 20th century as people started commuting to Ribnica to work.

=== Mass grave ===
Otavice is the site of a mass grave associated with the Second World War. The Otavice Pig Shaft Mass Grave (Slovene: Grobišče Otaviško svinjsko brezno) is located in the woods about 1.3 kilometers (0.81 mi) east of Otavice. It contains the remains of unidentified victims.

== Cultural heritage ==
There is a small chapel-shrine in the settlement. It was built in the late 19th or early 20th century. The shrine contains a statue of Our Lady of Sorrows that oral tradition says was brought from Rome.
