= Hanns Jelinek =

Austrian composer (1901–1969)

- Born: Johannes Jelinek; 5 December 1901; Vienna, Austria
- Died: 27 January 1969 (aged 67); Vienna
- Occupation: Composer
- Known for: Composing music

Hanns Jelinek (5 December 1901 – 27 January 1969) was an Austrian composer of Czech descent who is also known under the pseudonyms Hanns Elin, H. J. Hirsch, Jakob Fidelbogen.

== Biography ==
Jelinek was born and died in Vienna. His father was a machine operator (died 1917). At the age of 6 he began violin lessons and at age 7, began learning the piano. In 1918 he became a member of the newly founded Communist Party of Austria.

In 1918–19 Jelinek studied with Arnold Schoenberg at Eugenie Schwarzwald's School in Vienna, and privately with Alban Berg. These two influenced him to write many works in the twelve-tone technique. In 1920 he started the study with Franz Schmidt at the Vienna Academy of Music. However, in 1922 he broke off his studies for financial reasons, and thereafter studied music on his own.

In order to support himself as a self-employed composer in Vienna, he appeared as a pianist in bars and cinemas and composed popular music under the pseudonym Hanns Elin.

From 1958 on, he was a lecturer and, after 1965, a professor at the Vienna Academy of Music. In 1966, he was awarded the Grand Austrian State Prize.

== Compositions ==
Since 1934 (starting with his Second String Quartet op. 13) he used the twelve-tone technique in all of the works to which he gave an opus number. In 1956 in his Three Blue Sketches op. 25 he combined dodecaphony with jazz.

== Pupils ==
Among his pupils were: Petr Kotík, Gunnar Sonstevold, Maj Sønstevold, Igor Štuhec, Erich Urbanner, Junsang Bahk, Anne-Marie Ørbeck, Gregory Rose, Dawid Engela and Heinz Karl Gruber. Khosrow Sinai, future Iranian filmmaker, and Alireza Mashayekhi, one of the most important representatives of new music in Persia (Iran), studied under Jelinek for a while.

== Selected works ==
- Compositions
  - 13 kleine Lieder (13 Little Songs) for voice and Piano op. 1 (1927)
  - Präludium, Passacaglia und Fuge for chamber orchestra op. 4 (1922)
  - 3 Chansons after the texts by Erich Kästner (1930)
  - 1st String Quartet op. 10 (1931)
  - Suite for string orchestra op. 11 (1931)
  - Sinfonia concertante (Symphony No. 4) for string quartet and big orchestra op. 12 (1931)
  - 2nd String Quartet op. 13 (1934–35)
  - Bubi Caligula operetta (1947–53)
  - Zwölftonwerk op. 15 (1947–52)
  - Sinfonia brevis op. 16 (1948–50)
  - Concertino for strings op. 17 (1951)
  - Phantasie for clarinet, piano and orchestra op. 18 (1951)
  - Zwölftonfibel (Twelve-Tone Alphabet Book) for piano op. 21 (1953–54)
  - Sinfonia concertante (Symphony No. 6) op. 22 (1953)
  - Selbstbildnis des Marc Aurel (Self-Portrait of Marcus Aurelius) for speaker and four instrumental soloists op. 24 (1954)
  - Sonata for violin op. 27 (1956)
  - Unterwegs (On The Way): Cantata on the lyrics by Franz Kiessling for soprano, vibraphone and double bass. op. 28 (1957)
  - Four Songs on the lyrics by Franz Kiessling for middle voice and piano op. 29 (1957)
  - The Dances Around the Steel Blue Rose ballet (1956–59)
  - Canon nuptiale for mixed choir (1959)
  - Zehn zahme Xenien (Ten Tame Xenias) for violine and piano op. 32 (1960)
  - Rai Buba étude for piano and big orchestra op. 34 (1962)
- Writings
  - Musikalisches Hexeneinmaleins, in: Österreichische Musikzeitschrift, 6. Jg., 1951
  - Anleitung zur Zwölftonkomposition nebst allerlei Paralipomena (2 volumes), Vienna, 1952
  - Die krebsgleichen Allintervallreihen, in Archiv für Musikwissenschaft, 18. Jg., 1961
  - Musik in Film und Fernsehen, in: Österreichische Musikzeitschrift, 23. Jg., 1968

=== Films ===
- Love is Duty Free (1941)
- The Queen of the Landstrasse (1948)
- Lambert Feels Threatened (1949)

== See also ==
- List of Austrians in music
