= Janez Matičič =

Slovenian composer and pianist (1926–2022)

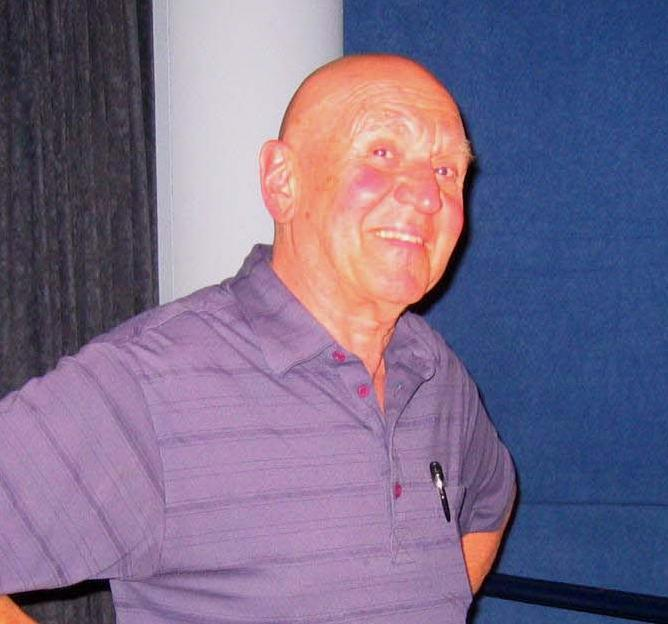
- Matičič in 2006

Background information
- Born: 3 June 1926; Ljubljana, Kingdom of Serbs, Croats and Slovenes
- Died: 18 April 2022 (aged 95) Ljubljana
- Occupations: Composer, pianist
- Instrument: Piano

Janez Matičič (3 June 1926 – 18 April 2022) was a Slovenian composer and pianist. He was a regular member of the Slovenian Academy of Sciences and Arts starting in 2007.

Matičič was born in Ljubljana, and was the brother of writer Nada Matičič. He graduated in composition from the Ljubljana Academy of Music in 1950 and conducting in 1951. From 1959 to 1961 he studied in Paris with Nadia Boulanger. Then, from 1959 to 1975, he collaborated with the Groupe de Recherches Musicales, who were experimenting with electroacoustic music under the direction of Pierre Schaeffer.

Among Matičič's works are two concertos for piano and orchestra, a concerto for cello and orchestra, and a number of pieces created in a modernist and experimental mode. In 2007 he received the Prešeren Award for his lifetime achievement in music. He died on April 17, 2022, at the age of 95.

== Works (Selection) ==
=== Choir and Orchestra ===
- Vision for choir and orchestra, op. 19 (1950)
- Artemis for choir and orchestra, op. 69 (2012)

=== Orchestra ===
- Symphony No. 1, op. 21 (1950–1953)
- Suite for string orchestra, op. 24 (1951–1955)
- Trans…, op. 56 (1997)
- Symphony No. 2, op. 58 (1997)

=== Solo Instrument and Orchestra ===
- Piano Concerto No. 1, op. 36 (1965)
- Violin Concerto, op. 49 (1978/1979)
- Piano Concerto No. 2, op. 52 (1985)
- Cello Concerto, op. 61 (2003)

=== Duos and Chamber Music ===
- String Quartet, op. 15 (1948–1949)
- Deux poèmes for viola and piano, op. 18 (1949)
- Ondulations for string quartet, op. 35 (1963)
- Synthéses for violin and piano, op. 41 (1969)
- Osmose for marimba and vibraphone, op. 54 (1992)
- Géodes for piano and percussion, op. 57 (1998)
- Repliques for alto saxophone and piano, op. 63 (2005)
- Canto rapsodico for clarinet and piano, op. 64 (2005)

=== Solo Piano ===
- Suite No. 1, op. 7 (1945–1946)
- Three Pieces, op. 20 (1951)
- Three Études for the Left Hand, op. 25 (1956)
- Miniature Variations, op. 29 (1957)
- Danses grotesques, op. 31 (1959)
- Suite No. 3, op. 33 (1961)
- Resonanzen, op. 34 (1963)
- Palpitations, op. 44 (1971)
- Toccata-Fantasie, op. 59 (2000)
- Sonata No. 3, op. 55 (1993, rev. 2002)
- Suite No. 4 “Polynesia”, op. 67 (2010)

=== Electroacoustic ===
- Oscillations, op. 37 (1966)
- Cosmophonie for piano and tape, op. 42 (1970)
- Formes, op. 43 (1971)
- Trois Visions, op. 46 (1975)
- Fusions, op. 51 (1979)

== See also ==
- List of Slovenian composers
