= Dušan Bavdek =

Slovenian composer (born 1971)

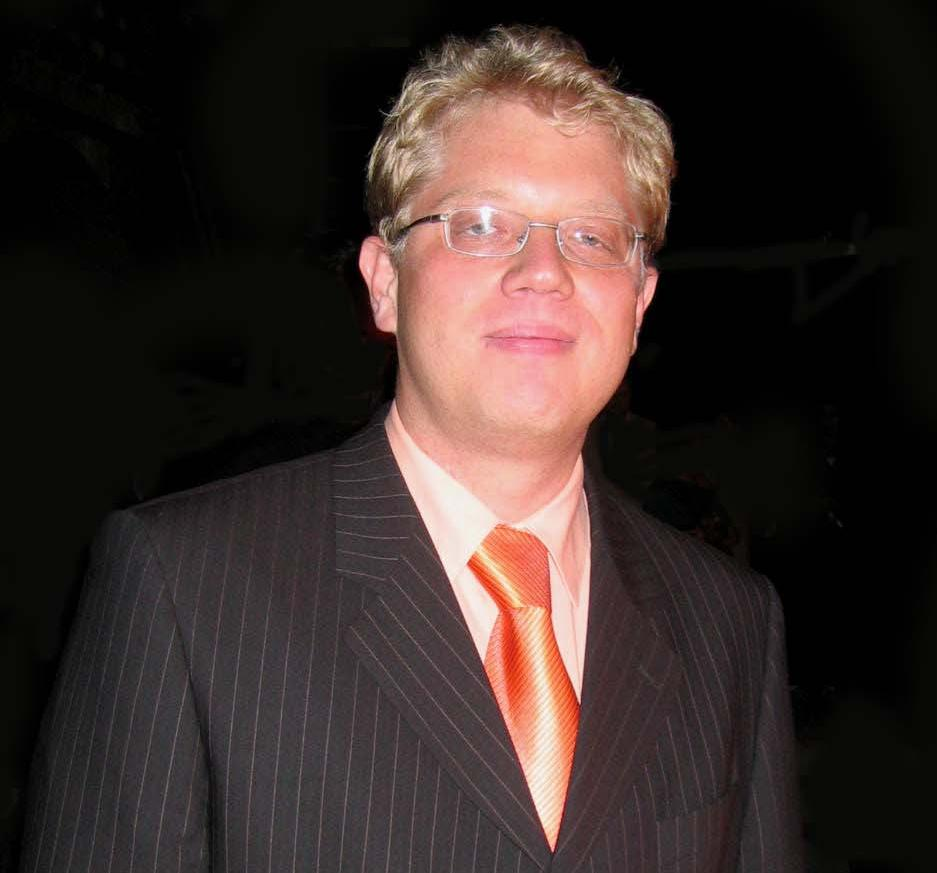
Dušan Bavdek

Dušan Bavdek (born 17 July 1971 in Kranj) is a Slovenian composer.

== See also ==
- List of Slovenian composers
