= Marjana Lipovšek =

Slovenian mezzo-soprano

Marjana Lipovšek (born 3 December 1946) is a Slovenian opera and concert singer (mezzo-soprano). The daughter of composer Marijan Lipovšek, she was born in Ljubljana, Slovenia. She retired in 2017 and now lives in her family house in Ljubljana.

She has sung in the film soundtracks of Jakob the Liar and The Grey Zone. Notable stage appearances include Die Frau ohne Schatten, Die Walküre and Tristan und Isolde. She has sung with many orchestras such as the Berlin Philharmonic, Boston Philharmonic, Concertgebouw Orchestra, Staatskapelle Dresden, London Philharmonic, London Symphony, Munich Philharmonic, New York Philharmonic and Vienna Philharmonic and companies such as the Bavarian State Opera, Chicago Lyric Opera, Metropolitan Opera in New York and Vienna State Opera. She has worked with such conductors as Claudio Abbado, Daniel Barenboim, Semyon Bychkov, Myung-Whun Chung, Colin Davis, Christoph von Dohnányi, Bernard Haitink, Nikolaus Harnoncourt, James Levine, Lorin Maazel, Zubin Mehta, Riccardo Muti, Kent Nagano, Giuseppe Sinopoli and Wolfgang Sawallisch.

== Famous relatives ==
- Marijan Lipovšek
- Emil Lipovšek
