= Alojz Ajdič =

Slovenian composer

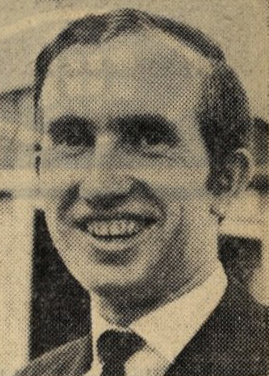
Alojz Ajdič

Alojz Ajdič (born September 6, 1939, Fojnica) is a multiple-time awarded Slovenian composer.

== Life and work ==
Ajdič graduated from clarinet in 1968 and worked then at first as a music teacher. From 1973 until 1983, he worked as the headmaster of the Kranj Music School in Kranj, Slovenia, and from 1978 until 1986 as the director of the Carinthia Music School in Klagenfurt, Austria. He has created orchestral works, vocal-instrumental works, choral works, and an opera, titled Brothers (Slovene: Brata). They are characterised by an intimate atmosphere and deep feelings. Ajdič lives in Britof pri Kranju.

== Recognitions ==
In 1994, Ajdič received the Župančič Award for his second symphony, named Window of the Soul. In 1997, he received the Prešeren Fund Award for his third symphony, entitled Symphony for Percussion and Symphony Orchestra. In 2009, he received the Kozina Award, bestowed by the Society of Slovenian Composers.

In 2012, his work Concert for Trombone and Orchestra was performed by the New York Philharmonic Orchestra. In April 2012, Ajdič's Rhapsody for Trumpet and Orchestra was performed in Huddersfield by the Slaithwaite Philharmonic Orchestra, with guest soloist, Rebecca Robertson. The composition received great acclaim. Avdič listened to it in the honorary lodge in the company of the mayor of Huddersfield and the leadership of the orchestra.

== Works ==
Among the more notable Ajdič's works are:

- Phantasy (Slovene: Fantazija; 1971)
- Colour Vision (Vizija barv; 1972)
- Concert Music for Horn and Orchestra (Koncertantna glasba za rog in orkester; 1978)
- Concert for Piano (Koncert za klavir; 1988)
- Mirage (Fatamorgana; 1984)

== See also ==
- List of Slovenian composers
