= Stanko Prek =

Slovenian musician (1915–1999)

Stanko Prek (1915, Solkan near Nova Gorica – 1999, Ljubljana) was a classical guitarist and composer from Slovenia.

He studied first in Ljubljana and then the Hochschule für Musik und Theater München, where he received his degree in classical guitar in 1941. In 1944 he finished composition studies with Lucijan Marija Škerjanc.

Stanko Prek was the first guitar professor at the Muzička akademija - Zagreb, Croatia (1), but also taught in Maribor and Ljubljana.

He made numerous publications, including compositions, arrangements and music theory books.

== Principal works ==
- Symphony in C sharp minor (1951)
- Nocturne for symphony orchestra (1944)
- Youth Suite for strings (1959)
- String Quartet in G major (1966)
- Nocturne for guitar (1950)
- Three Hundred Folk Tunes, an anthology of folk songs (1964)
- Pozdrav iz daljine (Greeting from Afar) for male choir (1954)
- Pomladna pesem (Spring Song) for youth choir (1957)
- Serenade for voice and guitar (or piano) (1946)

== Classical guitar method ==
- Klasična Kitara - Šola 1 (Državna založba Slovenije)
- Klasična Kitara - Šola 2 (Državna založba Slovenije)
- further publications are published by Državna založba Slovenije

== Quotes ==
Beethoven did break musical rules in the service of beauty, whereas nowadays there are many who break them for very different reasons (and there are others, who are not even familiar with the rules).
A state of chaos has occurred in music, and it was caused by ignorance. Goethe’s thought had forewarned us: Nothing is more frightful than ignorance, when it becomes operative!

— Stanko Prek
