= Oksana Pečeny =

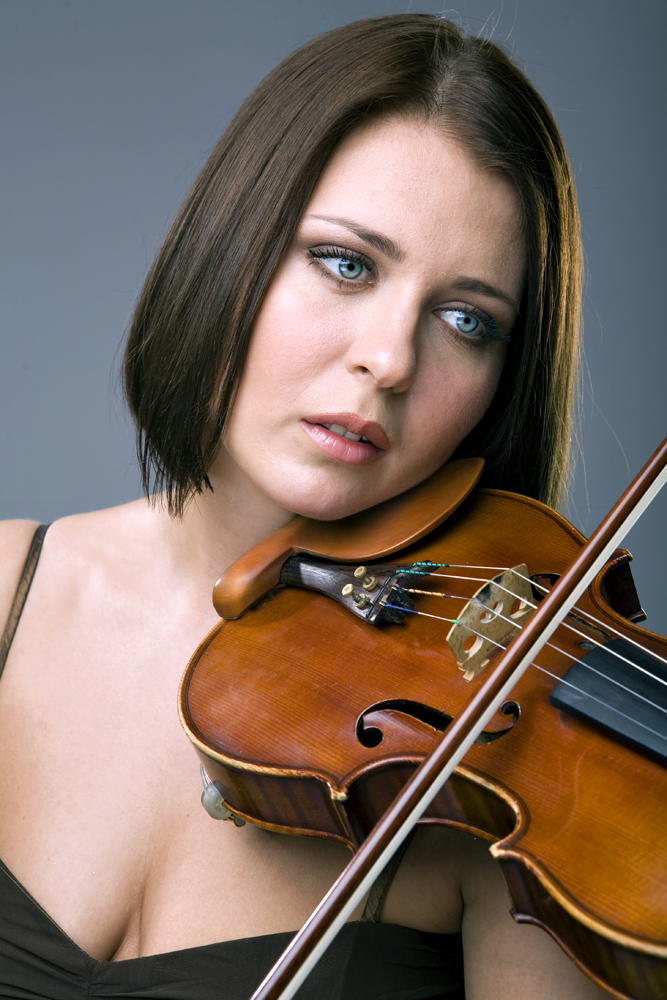

Background information
- Born: April 23, 1983 (age 41); Kiev, Ukraine
- Genres: Classical music
- Occupation(s): Musician, pedagogue
- Instrument: Violin
- Years active: 1988–present

Oksana Pečeny (born April 23, 1983) is a Ukrainian-Slovenian violinist.

== Biography ==
=== Early life and education ===
Oksana Pečeny was born April 23, 1983, in Kiev, Ukraine. She received her first musical education at the Special school for talented children in Kiev and continued her studies at the secondary school in Maribor in the class taught by her father, Taras Peceny. She then continued a three semester study with Boris Kusnir in Graz and since 2002, has been a student of Primož Novsak at the Music Academy in Ljubljana, where she is graduated in December 2007.

=== Career ===
As a soloist she performed with every orchestra in Slovenia: the Slovenian Philharmonic Orchestra, RTV Slovenia Symphony Orchestra, Symphony Orchestra of Music Academy from Ljubljana, SNG Opera and ballet Ljubljana, the Maribor philharmonics, Solisti Piranesi orchestra, Chamber orchestra of Slovenian soloists and the Zagreb symphonic orchestra.

Since she was 15, Oksana has performed in all the Slovenian professional orchestras. She has been employed by the Slovenian Philharmonic as the second concertmaster, for the past two years she has been playing as the solo violin and the second concertmaster in the Solisti Piranesi orchestra, led by Primoz Novsak, she is the first concertmaster of the ladies chamber and symphonic orchestra Musidora, and has been the only concertmaster of the chamber and symphonic orchestra of the Music Academy of Ljubljana for the past three years. Oksana has led the 5th symphony by Tchaikovsky, the 1st symphony by Mahler, the 5th symphony by Shostakovich and the 7th symphony by Beethoven.

In 2006 she was invited to join the Animato Fundacion International Youth Orchestra as the concertmaster, conducted by Ralph Weikert. In October and November 2006, she had the honour of performing with the Tonhalle Orchester Zurich as the 2nd concertmaster, conducted by David Zinman. Since 2013 Oksana has been a concertmaster in SNG Maribor.

== Awards ==
She received the Student Preseren Award in 2004 for the Violin Concerto by Sibelius with the Slovenian Philharmonic, and is the winner of several national and international competitions in Slovenia, Italy and the Netherlands.
