= Johann Baptist Novak =

Slovene composer and musician (1756–1833)

- Born: c. 1756; Ljubljana, Holy Roman Empire (now Slovenia)
- Died: January 29, 1833 (aged 76–77); Ljubljana, Austrian Empire (now Slovenia)
- Occupation: Composer

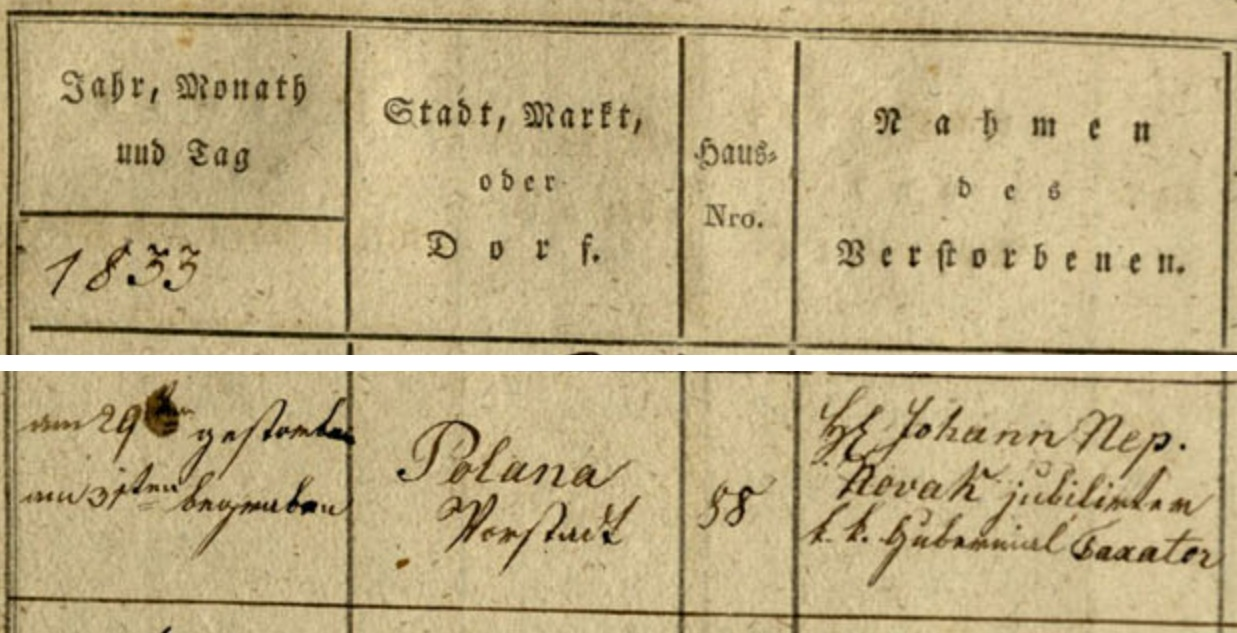
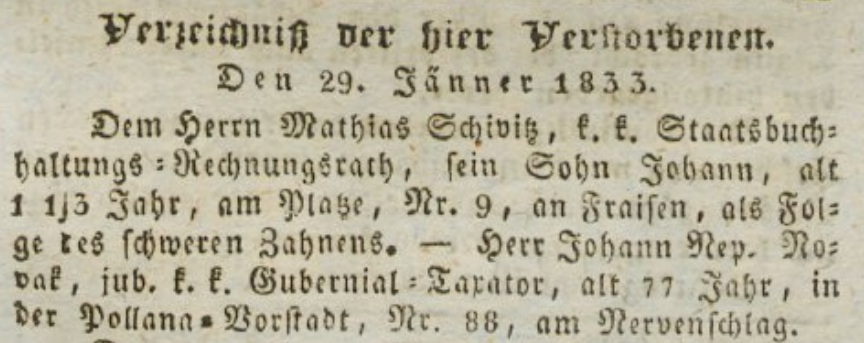
Johann Baptist Novak (Note: Novak's parish death record and his death announcement refer to him as Johann Nep[omuk]. Novak; compare the birth of a Johann Nepomuk Novak (Joannes Nepom. Novag) in the same parish on May 12, 1756. Novak's parish death record Novak's death announcement) (Slovenized: Janez Krstnik Novak, c. 1756 – January 29, 1833) was a Slovene composer.

== Life ==
Novak was born in Ljubljana, at that time part of the Holy Roman Empire, c. 1756. He died in Ljubljana on January 29, 1833.

== Career ==
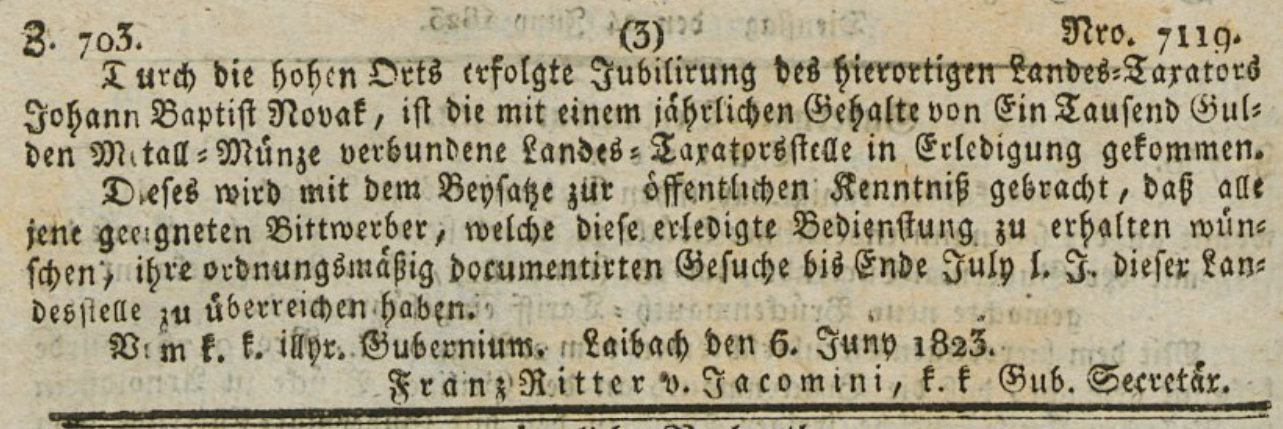
Announcement of Novak's retirement as a tax official in 1823

He made his living as an official in the provincial administration, but at the same time he actively participated in Ljubljana's musical life as a singer, violinist, and composer. Novak was one of the rare representatives of musical classicism in the Slovene territory. He was one of the founding members of the Ljubljana Philharmonic Society in 1794. He participated in the society's orchestra (the predecessor of the Slovenian Philharmonic Orchestra) as its concertmaster in 1799 and 1800, and from 1808 to 1825 he was the artistic director of this ensemble.

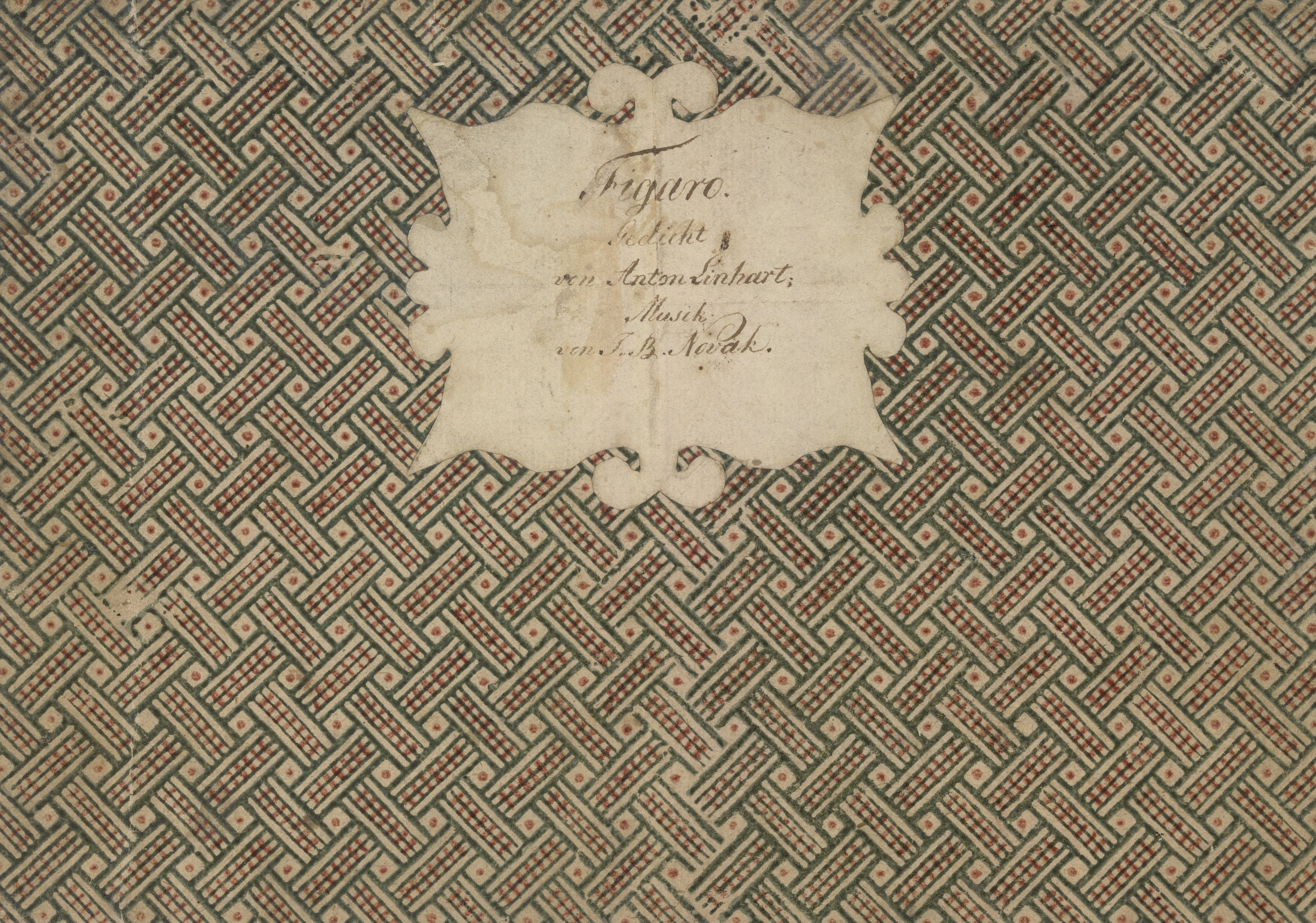
Cover of Novak's Figaro

In 1790 he composed incidental music titled Figaro to Linhart's play Ta veseli dan ali Matiček se ženi. Due to the quality of his music, the theatrical play approached opera in character. Along with some cantatas, this is one of Novak's more prominent musical works, most of which have been lost.

In 2007, Novak's "Birthday Cantata" (German: Cantate zum Geburts oder Namensfeste einer Mutter 'Cantata for a Mother's Birthday or Namesday') was performed for the first time in Ljubljana. It is not known when it was written. It is preserved in the archives of the Giuseppe Tartini Conservatory in Trieste. This cantata—written for soprano, alto, tenor, and bass accompanied by a small orchestra (flute, string quartet, and double bass) to a German text by an unknown author that celebrates maternal love—was written by Novak for the celebration of the birthday of a lady in some noble or wealthy bourgeois house.
