= Julij Betetto =

Slovenian musician (1885–1963)

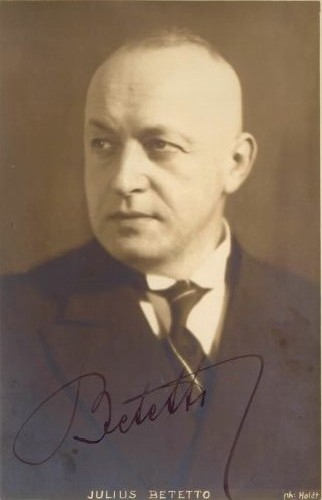
- Julij Betetto in 1930
- Born: August 27, 1885; Laibach, Duchy of Carniola, Cisleithania, Austria-Hungary
- Died: January 14, 1963 (aged 77); Ljubljana, Fed. People's Rep. of Yugoslavia
- Occupations: Singer, composer

Julij Betetto (August 27, 1885 – January 14, 1963 in Ljubljana) was a Slovenian bass singer and composer. He was the first dean of the Ljubljana Academy of Music. Since 1980, the Slovene Music Artists Association has awarded the Betetto Award annually for best original music achievements; the last Betetto Award was given in 2012.
