= Boris Bizjak =

Slovenian flautist

Boris Bizjak (born 1981) is London-based Slovenian flautist. He has performed as a soloist and chamber musician in the UK, USA, China, Japan, Slovenia, Croatia, France, Spain and Cyprus. In 2016, he was selected by the Slovenian Government to perform a series of concerts in Slovenia, the UK, the US and Japan to commemorate the 25th anniversary of Slovenian Independence.

== Education ==
Bizjak graduated from the ENMP "Alfred Cortot" in Paris, where he obtained the "Diplôme Supérieur de Concertiste" guided by renowned French flautist Pierre-Yves Artaud (CNSMDP). He was also guided by Georges Alirol at the École Nationale de Musique de Danse et d'Art Dramatique Marcel Dadi, Fedja Rupel at the Academy of Music in Ljubljana, Marzio Conti in Florence and Jasenka Jelacic at the Music Conservatoire in Ljubljana.

== Prizes ==
Bizjak is a first prize winner of the International Flute Competition in Picardie, France. He is also three times 1st prize winner of the TEMSIG Slovenian National Flute Competition and twice prizewinner of the TEMSIG Slovenian National Chamber Music Competition.
