= Luka Juhart =

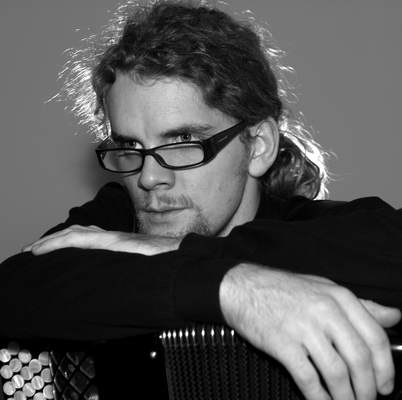
- Luka Juhart

Background information
- Born: September 19, 1982; Celje, Slovenia
- Instrument: Accordion
- Years active: 2005–present

Luka Juhart was born in Slovenia in 1982. After the graduation from the High School of Music in Maribor, in the class of Andrej Lorber, he entered the Academy of Music in Trossingen (Staatliche Hochschule für Musik Trossingen), where he graduated in the accordion class of Hugo Noth. He obtained two degrees: a pedagogical one (Diplom Musiklehrer, 2005) and an artistic one (Künstlerische Ausbildung, 2006). Currently he is doing a master's degree at the Hochschule für Musik Würzburg, in the class of Stefan Hussong. He has also taken part in master courses and workshops led by Margit Kern, Ivan Koval, Tomaž Lorenz, Christoph Bossert, etc.

Luka Juhart has received several awards in national and international competitions, among which the Dr. Roman Klasinc Prize for exceptional artistic achievements (2001), the DAAD Prize for the best foreign student of the Academy of Music at Trossingen (2002) and the Iris Marquardt Prize (2003). He has given solo and chamber music concerts in Slovenia, Austria, Germany, Switzerland, Sweden, Denmark, France, Italy and Croatia. Occasionally, he records for various radio stations (such as RTV Ljubljana, RTV Maribor and ORF). Currently he's working with several contemporary composers, such as Uroš Rojko, Klaus Huber, Vinko Globokar and Stefan Beyer.
