= Dejan Bravničar =

Slovenian violinist

Dejan Bravničar (October 1, 1937 in Ljubljana, – March 21, 2018) was a Slovenian violinist. His father was the composer Matija Bravničar, and his mother was the ballet dancer and teacher Gizela Bravničar.

He studied at the Music School in Ljubljana, as a student in the class of sl:Fran Stanič. He graduated from the Ljubljana Academy of Music in 1957 under Karel Rupel (1907–1968). From 1957 to 1960 he studied at the Moscow Conservatory in the class of the violinist David Oistrach and then trained at the Accademia Nazionale di Santa Cecilia in Rome for a year under Italian violinist Pina Carmirelli.

He began solely as a concert performer and as a soloist has performed with many orchestras under notable conductors, but later he worked as an educator. He played in England, France, Austria, Bulgaria, the Netherlands, Hungary, Poland, Switzerland and elsewhere. He collaborated with many foreign conductors such as Paul Klecki, Kurt Sanderling, Kirill Kondrashin, Carlo Zecchi, Jean Martinon, Riccardo Muti, and others. His repertoire includes more than 40 violin concertos by composers such as Vivaldi, Bach, Mozart, Beethoven, Paganini, Wieniawski, Mendelssohn, Brahms, Tchaikovsky, Lalo, Sibelius, Karol Szymanowski, Khachaturian, Bartók, Stravinsky, Hindemith, Prokofiev, Shostakovich and also music of Slovenian composers.

From 1967 he was professor of violin at the Music Academy of Ljubljana, and, between 1993 and 2001, was also dean of the institution.
