= Matija Bravničar =

Slovenian composer

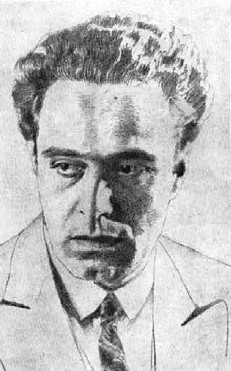
Matija Bravničar in 1930

Matija Bravničar (24 February 1897 in Tolmin – 25 November 1977 in Ljubljana) was a Slovenian composer.

Bravničar was one of the first Slovenian symphonic composers. He composed four symphonies, two operas, several symphonic poems, chamber music, and other works. He first began studying the violin, and then studied composition with Mario Kogoj and Slavko Osterc at the Ljubljana Conservatory. He was a member of the opera orchestra in Ljubljana, and after the war a professor of composition. As an expressionist composer, his compositions often used elements of Slovenian folk music tradition.

In 1963 he received the Prešeren Award for his Concerto for Violin and Orchestra. From 1972 until his death he was a member of the Slovenian Academy of Sciences and Arts.

He married the ballet dancer and choreographer Gizela Bravničar in 1932. His son Dejan Bravničar is a noted Slovenian violinist, and his grandson is the pianist Igor Bravničar.

== See also ==
- List of Slovenian composers
