= Georg Prenner =

16th-century Slovenian composer

Georg Prenner (aka. Brenner or Pyrenaeus, born Laibach, present-day Ljubljana; died St Pölten, 4 February 1590) was active as a composer in Prague during the 1560s, when 39 of his motets were printed in various anthologies. A few additional works survive in manuscripts, and a modern edition appeared as Monumenta artis musicae Sloveniae, xxiv, Ljubljana, 1994.

He is first documented in 1554 as a copyist in the Prague Kapelle of the Archduke Maximillian, later Emperor Maximilian II. On 20 August 1572 Prenner was appointed abbot of the monastery of St Dorothea, Vienna (site of the present Dorotheum), and in 1578 he moved to the Herzogenburg Priory near St Pölten.

== Sources ==
- Dunning, Albert (2001). "Prenner, Georg". In Sadie, Stanley; Tyrrell, John (eds.). The New Grove Dictionary of Music and Musicians (2nd ed.). London: Macmillan Publishers. ISBN 978-1-56159-239-5.
