= Emerik Beran =

Slovenian composer and cellist

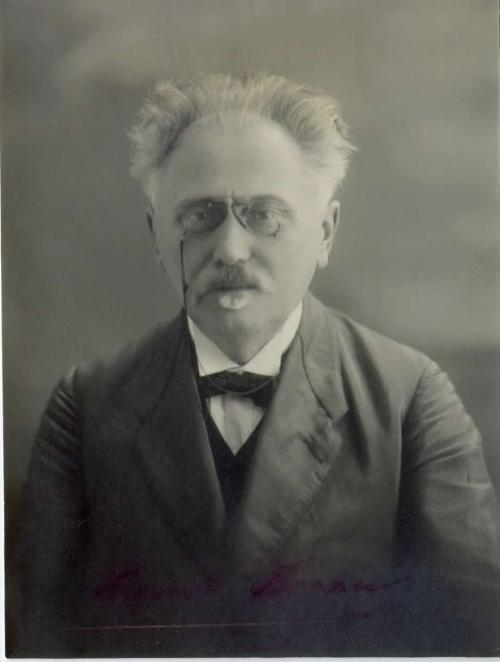
Emerik Beran

Emerik Beran (17 October 1868 – 10 March 1940) was a Slovenian composer and cellist of Czech descent. He educated numerous cellists in Ljubljana as a professor at the Ljubljana Music and Ballet Conservatory from 1928 until 1936.
