= David Ruff =

American artist and printer

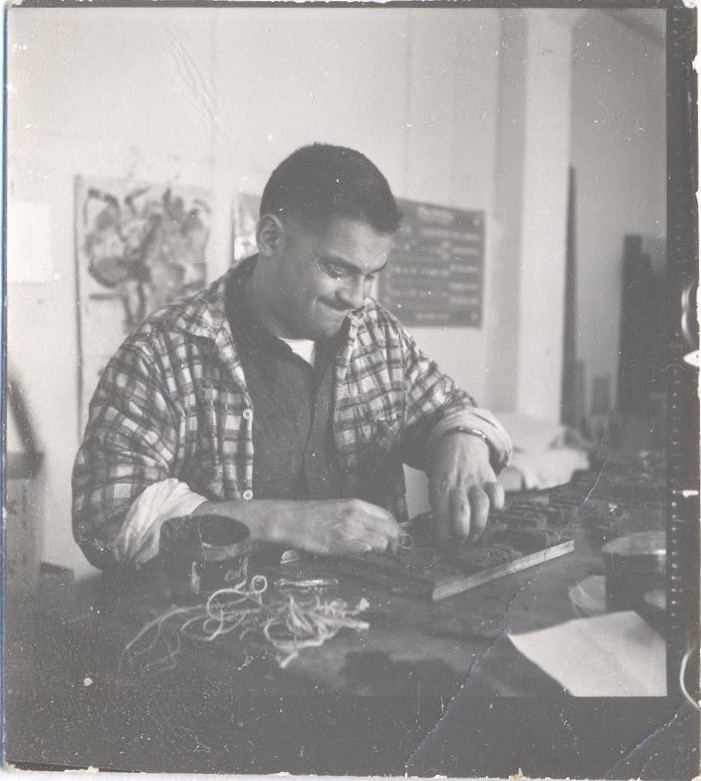
- David Ruff working at The Print Workshop

David Ruff (1925-2007) was an American painter and printmaker.

In 1950, Ruff and his wife, writer Holly Beye (1922–2011), moved to San Francisco, where Ruff founded the fine art print publishing studio The Print Workshop. His plan was "to produce fine books of poetry – books such as those I saw on a visit to Henry Miller in Big Sur: beautiful limited editions printed in Paris with etchings and lithographs by great artists".

By the spring of 1951, Ruff had taught himself how to set type and had acquired a letterpress. In this year, he co-founded the small press The Jargon Society together with the poet Jonathan Williams.

Ruff designed, printed and did etchings for limited editions of poems by his wife, by Kenneth Patchen, and by Jonathan Williams. He worked with the little magazine Inferno, taught evening classes in fine-press printing and engraving methods, and printed business cards for neighborhood dressmakers, letterhead paper, and concert programs.

An exhibit of his work was held at the Book Club of California in 1952 and an etching by Ruff acquired by Moore Achenbach is in the Fine Arts Museums of San Francisco. Other prints and books from TPW are in the collections of the Rare Book Room and Prints Division at the New York Public Library on 42nd Street, Brown University, Yale University, SUNY at Buffalo. In 1955, Ruff printed the first edition (500 copies) of Lawrence Ferlinghetti's Pictures of the Gone World (Pocket Poets 1).

The Print Workshop closed in 1955, and Ruff and Beye moved back to the East Coast.
