= Marija Hladnik Berden =

Slovenian teacher, organist, and composer (1892–1924)

Marija Hladnik Berden - Mimi
- Born: Marija Hladnik; 30 March 1892; Novo Mesto, Austria-Hungary
- Died: 10 May 1924 (aged 32); Novo Mesto, Kingdom of Serbs, Croats and Slovenes
- Occupations: teacher, organist, pianist, music teacher, soprano, composer

Marija Hladnik Berden, also known as Mimi Hladnik (30 March 1892 – 10 May 1924), was a Slovenian teacher, organist, and composer. She was regarded as one of the most musically gifted women of her generation in Lower Carniola, where she worked as a teacher, church organist, soprano, and pianist. She composed mainly church music, appeared as a soloist, and in addition to her regular employment also taught piano. Her life ended tragically when she was poisoned at the age of thirty-two.

== Childhood and education ==
She was born on 30 March 1892 into a Slovenian family in Novo Mesto, where she was baptised on 2 April in the Novo Mesto Cathedral. Her name day was celebrated on the Assumption of Mary. Her mother was Marija Knaus (1865–1948) from Goriča Vas and her father was Ignacij Hladnik (1865–1932) from Križe. At the time of her birth, her father held the poorly paid post of chapter organist. Because of this, he had the right to use a small plot of church-owned farmland, which he cultivated together with her mother, whose parents were farmers. She had six brothers and sisters, two of whom died in childhood. Of her surviving sisters, one devoted herself to teaching, another, Štefanija Hladnik Hanak, was employed as a piano teacher and founded the Ignacij Hladnik Music School in Novo Mesto, while another was a milliner. Of all the children, she was the most musically gifted and therefore her father's favourite. She studied piano and organ with her father.

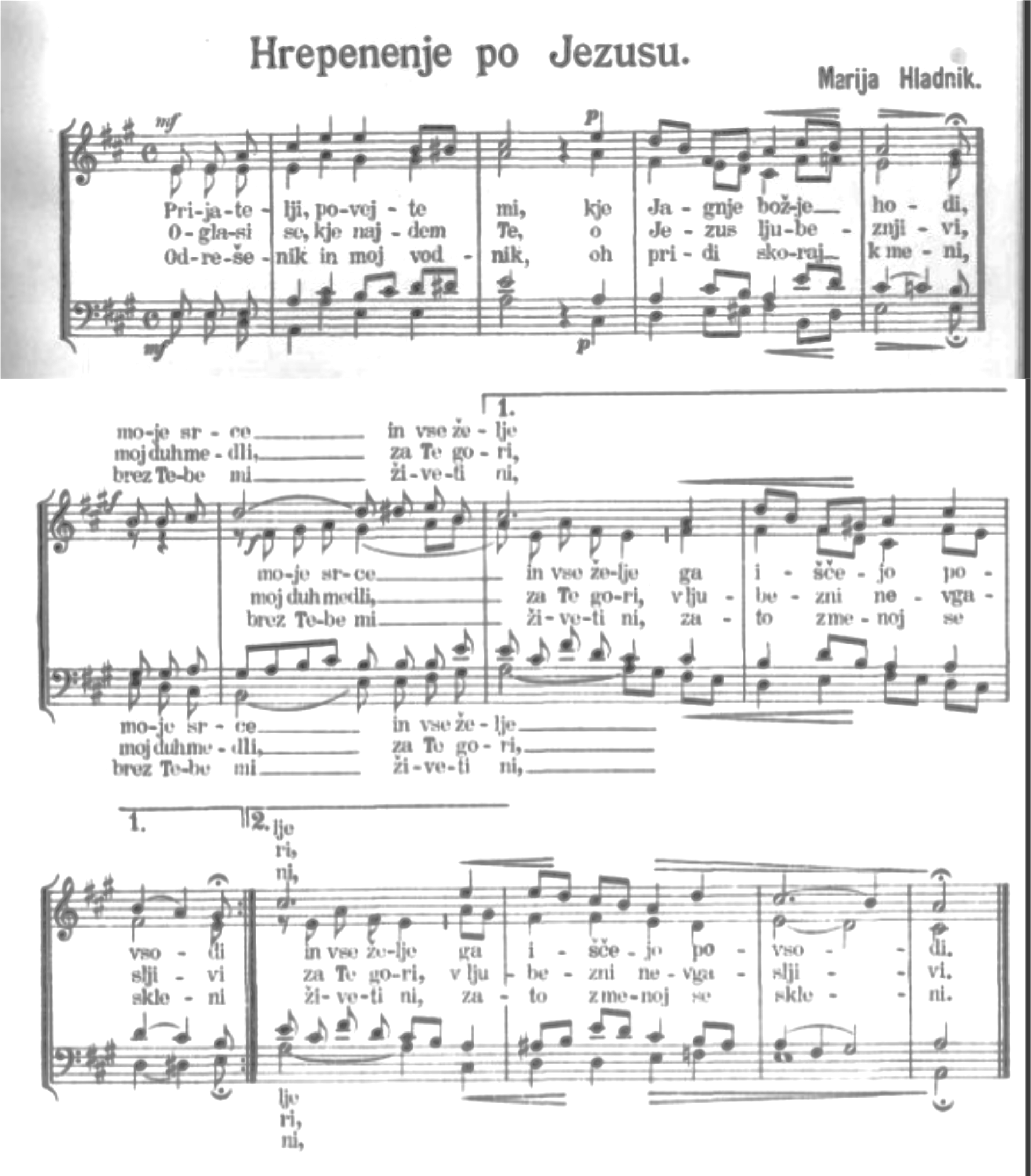
The song Hrepenenje po Jezusu (Longing for Jesus), composed by Marija Hladnik Berden in 1916

In 1907, she became a pupil at the teacher-training college run by the Ursulines in Ljubljana. Her classmate was also the future doctor of philosophy and painter Frančiška Pija Garantini. During holidays, she often played the organ in the chapter church in Novo Mesto in place of her father. She graduated in 1911.

== Career ==
On 17 November 1913, at the teacher-training college in Ljubljana, she passed the qualifying examination for a teacher in elementary schools with Slovenian and German as languages of instruction. After graduating, she obtained a job as a teacher in Kostanjevica na Krki, where she worked until 1923.

She was an excellent soprano and frequently appeared as a soloist. She also composed, focusing mainly church songs. Her church composition Hrepenenje po Jezusu (Longing for Jesus) was published in 1916 in the newspaper Cerkveni glasbenik (Church Musician). She frequently performed on the piano. She was regarded as one of the best pianists in Lower Carniola. For seven years, she was and organist in the church of Saint James in Kostanjevica. In addition to her job, she also taught piano privately. Among her pupils was the future opera singer Milena Trost.

In 1919, she joined the Slomškova zveza association of Catholic teachers, which was founded in 1900 by Marija Štupca and three other teachers. On 2 February 1923, she married the teacher Franc Berden (1895–1971) from Filovci. The couple moved to Stopiče, where she obtained a job of a teacher, which she held until her death. In November 1923, she gave birth to her only child, a son, Vasilij Berden (1923–2009), who later became a lawyer.

== Death ==
On 2 April 1924, her maid, the thirty-two-year-old Marija Golobič from Plemberk, made pancakes with jam for supper. While eating, Marija Hladnik Berden remarked that they had a strange sulphur-like taste. The maid told her that a few matches had fallen into the milk used for the pancakes and that, to be safe, she had added some laxative powder to the dish, which reassured her mistress enough that she ate the pancakes. The maid and Franc Berden only tasted the pancakes. After midnight, Marija Hladnik Berden awoke with severe stomach pains and began to show early signs of phosphorus poisoning. The next day she taught at school, but the pains returned and she went to see a doctor telling him what she was feeling and about the matches in the food. The doctor believed that there would be no serious consequences. The pains increased, and after a week, already greatly weakened, she went to the women's hospital in Novo Mesto, where her stomach was immediately pumped. It was too late and on the following day, 10 May 1924, she died in hospital. She left behind an infant son only five months old. She was buried in the Novo Mesto cemetery on 12 May 1924, with the teachers' choir singing, by the composer and canon-curate of the collegiate chapter in Novo Mesto, Fran Ferjančič.

== Trial ==
The doctors at the Novo Mesto hospital concluded that Marija Hladnik Berden died of phosphorus poisoning. Her maid said that an entire box of matches had accidentally fallen into the milk and boiled in it. She said that she had used this milk to prepare omelettes, which her mistress ate. The forensic autopsy showed that there was a greater quantity of poison in her body than could have come from one box of matches. The police became suspicious of the maid and placed her under surveillance.

A few days after Marija's funeral, Marija Golobič told the deceased's sister that she had dreamed that her dead mistress had entrusted her son to her care and ordered her to remain in the household. She allegedly told the widower that his wife had ordered in a dream that the two of them must marry. As a result of these statements, the police searched her suitcase. They found two packets of rat poison inside. Golobič at first denied using poison, but later stated that on the morning of 2 April she had spread phosphorus paste on corn mush to set out for rats, and that in the evening she had used the same knife, without wiping it because it seemed perfectly clean to her, to spread jam on the pancakes. The police arrested her and took her to prison in Novo Mesto. In December 1924, she was convicted before a Novo Mesto jury of poisoning her mistress. Because the act could not be proven with certainty, since the examination of the deceased's stomach was delayed too long, she was sentenced only to ten months’ imprisonment for negligent handling of poison. This already included seven months of pre-trial detention. A few years later, the widower of Marija Hladnik Berden married her sister Milka Hladnik (1900–1974), a milliner.

== In literature ==
The writer and composer as Nina Dragičević wrote a poetic short story about her life and death, titled Ena Marija, dve Mariji, nobene Marije (One Marija, Two Marijas, No Marija), which was published in 2025 by Beletrina in the author's collection of short stories about Slovenian women composers, entitled Nemogoče (Impossible). For this short story, in its radio adaptation, the author received the 2025 Lastovka Award of Ars program of Radiotelevizija Slovenija for best short story. The entire book was among the ten nominees for the Grand Prize of the Slovene book fair in 2025.
