= Gizela Bravničar =

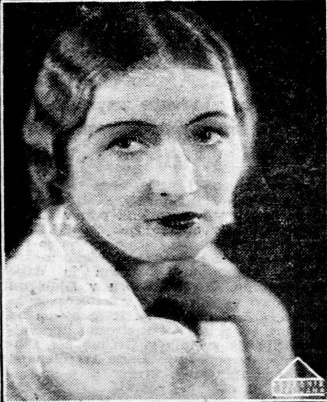
- Born: Gizela Pavšič; 20 February 1908; Trieste
- Died: 3 February 1990 (aged 81); Ljubljana, Slovenia
- Occupations: ballet dancer, teacher, and choreographer

Gizela Bravničar (20 February 1908 – 3 February 1990) was a Slovenian ballet dancer, teacher, and choreographer.

== Biography ==
Gizela Bravničar was born Gizela Bravničar in Trieste on 20 February 1908. She was privately tutored in ballet by Marija Tuljakova and Peter Gresserov. She married Matija Bravničar in 1932. She was a member of the Ljubljana Slovene National Theatre Opera and Ballet's troupe from 1927 to 1952. Bravničar danced most of the title roles whilst with the National Ballet, proving popular with audiences. Her best roles at the stage were Scheherezade by Rimsky Korsakov, a ballerina in Petrushka by Stravinskiy. From 1964 she became the Principal of the Secondary Ballet School in Ljubljana (now Ljubljana Music and Ballet Conservatory).

Bravničar had one child with Matija, Dejan Bravničar. She died in Ljubljana on 3 February 1990.
