= Danilo Švara =

Slovenian orchestra conductor and composer

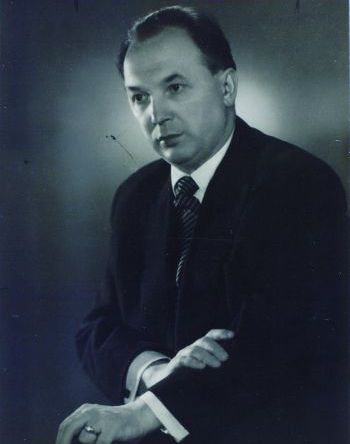
Danilo Švara

Danilo Švara (2 April 1902 San Giuseppe della Chiusa (San Dorligo della Valle), Italy - 25 April 1981 Ljubljana) was a prominent Slovenian orchestra conductor and composer.

== Works ==
=== Opera ===
- Kleopatra (1940)
- Veronika Deseniška 1946)
- Slovo od mladosti (Prešeren) (1954)
- Ocean (1969)
- Štirje junaki (1974)
