= Celestina Ekel =

Slovenian music teacher, organist and composer (1867–1935)

- Born: Celestina Terezija Ivana Ekel; November 15, 1867; Novo Mesto
- Died: April 20, 1935 (aged 67); Graz
- Occupations: music teacher, musician, organist, composer

Celestina Terezija Ivana Ekel, Sister Alakok, (November 15, 1867 – April 20, 1935), was a Slovenian music teacher, musician, organist and composer.

== Childhood and youth ==
Celestina was born on November 15, 1867, in Novo Mesto, into a wealthy and prominent family. Her father was Joseph Ekel, a district governor and government councilor in Novo Mesto, and her mother was Cölestine von Stransky, a noblewoman. Celestina had ten brothers and sisters. She was baptized by the then canon of Novo Mesto, later provost, Simon Wilfam.

Celestina was educated to become a kindegarten teacher. She attended school in Novo Mesto. However, since only a one-grade school existed in the town at the time, she mostly received private education. She began learning music at home, where the family had a piano. A private music teacher came to their home to teach her piano. In 1889, Celestina moved with her parents to Ljubljana. In 1892, her father died, which deeply affected her.

== Work ==
After her father’s death, Celestina decided to dedicate herself to monastic life. She entered the congregation of the Sisters of the Holy Cross in Bruck an der Mur. There, she continued her music education. She was later sent to Trieste and to Aussee in Lower Austria, where she further developed her musical skills and began teaching music herself.

Eventually, she moved to Graz, where she lived in the Sisters of the Holy Cross' convent until her death. She worked there as a music teacher for the convent schoolgirls, as well as for other local girls whom she taught privately. She also served as the organist in the convent church and at the St. Charles Borromeo Institute. She occasionally played the organ in other churches as well.

From Graz, she went to Vienna, where she passed a music exam at the conservatory. She then returned to Graz and continued her work as a music teacher and organist. In addition, since she spoke Slovene, she also taught the Slovene language to novices. She remained active in music until her death.

She died of a heart attack during the night between Good Friday and Holy Saturday, on April 20, 1935. The day before, on Good Friday, she had still sung during the Stations of the Cross. The next morning, on Holy Saturday, she was found dead in her bed.

== Celestina as composer ==
As a composer, in 1925 Celestina published her first 12 church songs through the Graz-based publishing house Styria: 10 benediction hymns and 2 in honor of the Sacred Heart of Jesus, in the booklet Lasset uns anbeten! (Let Us Adore!). This work was also published in Slovene in 1927 under the title Pridite molimo! (Come, Let Us Pray!) by the Yugoslav Bookstore in Ljubljana. The main difference between the two editions was that the German version was arranged for a women’s choir, while the Slovene version was arranged for a mixed choir.

A second collection of her compositions in Slovene appeared in 1931, also published by the Yugoslav Bookstore, under the title Šopek 10 cerkvenih pesmi za mešani zbor (A Bouquet of 10 Church Songs for Mixed Choir). These were the only two volumes published with Slovene lyrics.

She published several other compositions in German. For example, five of her pieces for women’s choir with organ or harmonium accompaniment were published by Feuchtinger & Gleichauf in Regensburg. Among her handwritten works is a piece titled "Grablied für eine Braut Christi" (Funeral Song for a Bride of Christ), arranged for three-part women’s choir with accompaniment.
