= Goriča Vas =

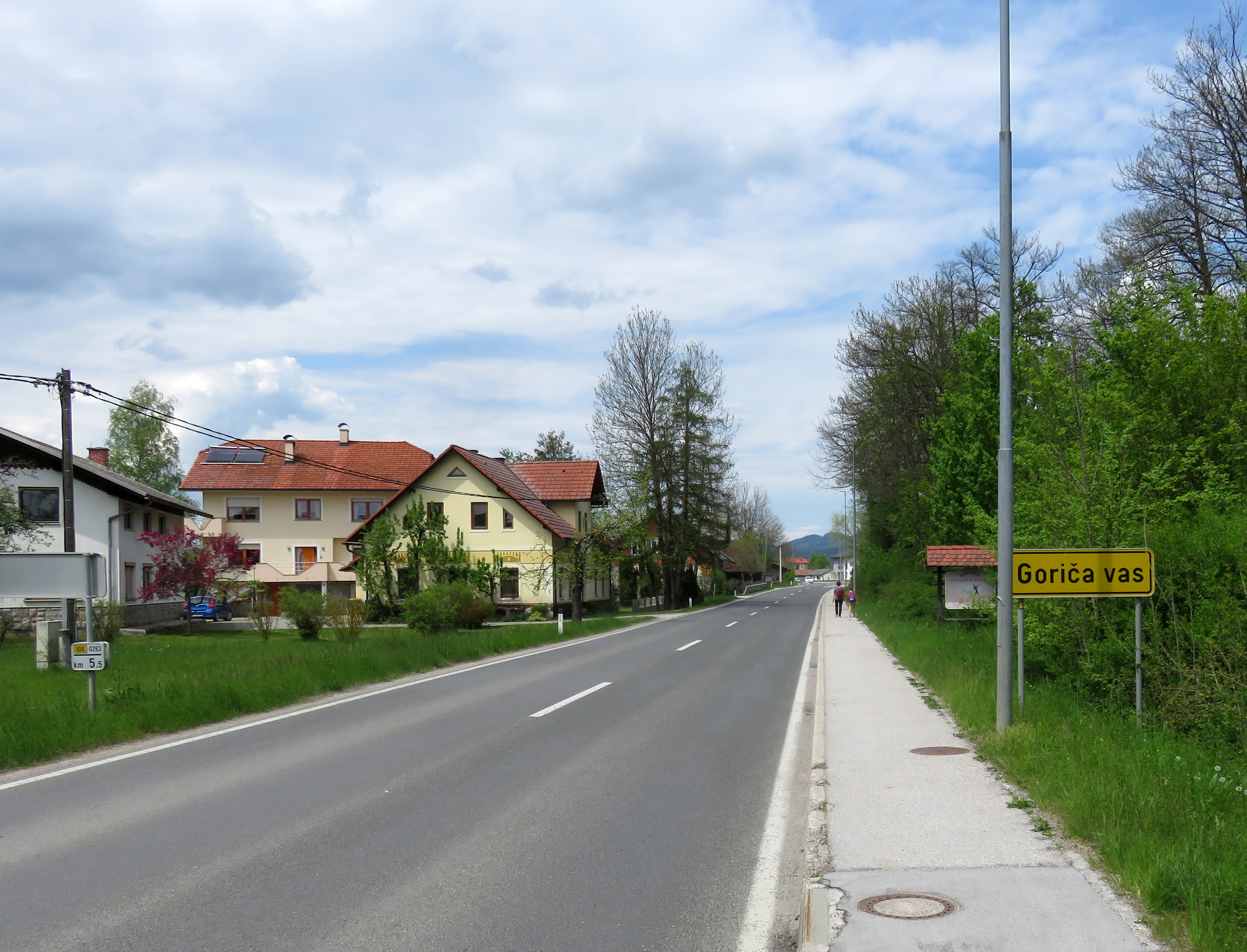

- Location in Slovenia
- Coordinates: 45°43′40.98″N 14°44′14.54″E
- Country: Slovenia
- Traditional region: Lower Carniola
- Statistical region: Southeast Slovenia
- Municipality: Ribnica

Area
  - Total: 1.97 km^{2} (0.76 sq mi)
- Elevation: 489.3 m (1,605 ft)

Population (2002)
  - Total: 437
- Postal code: 1310

Goriča Vas (pronounced [ɡɔˈɾiːtʃa ˈʋaːs]; Slovene: Goriča vas, German: Weikersdorf) is a village in the Municipality of Ribnica in southern Slovenia. It lies just south of the town of Ribnica. The area is part of the traditional region of Lower Carniola and is now included in the Southeast Slovenia Statistical Region.

== Church ==
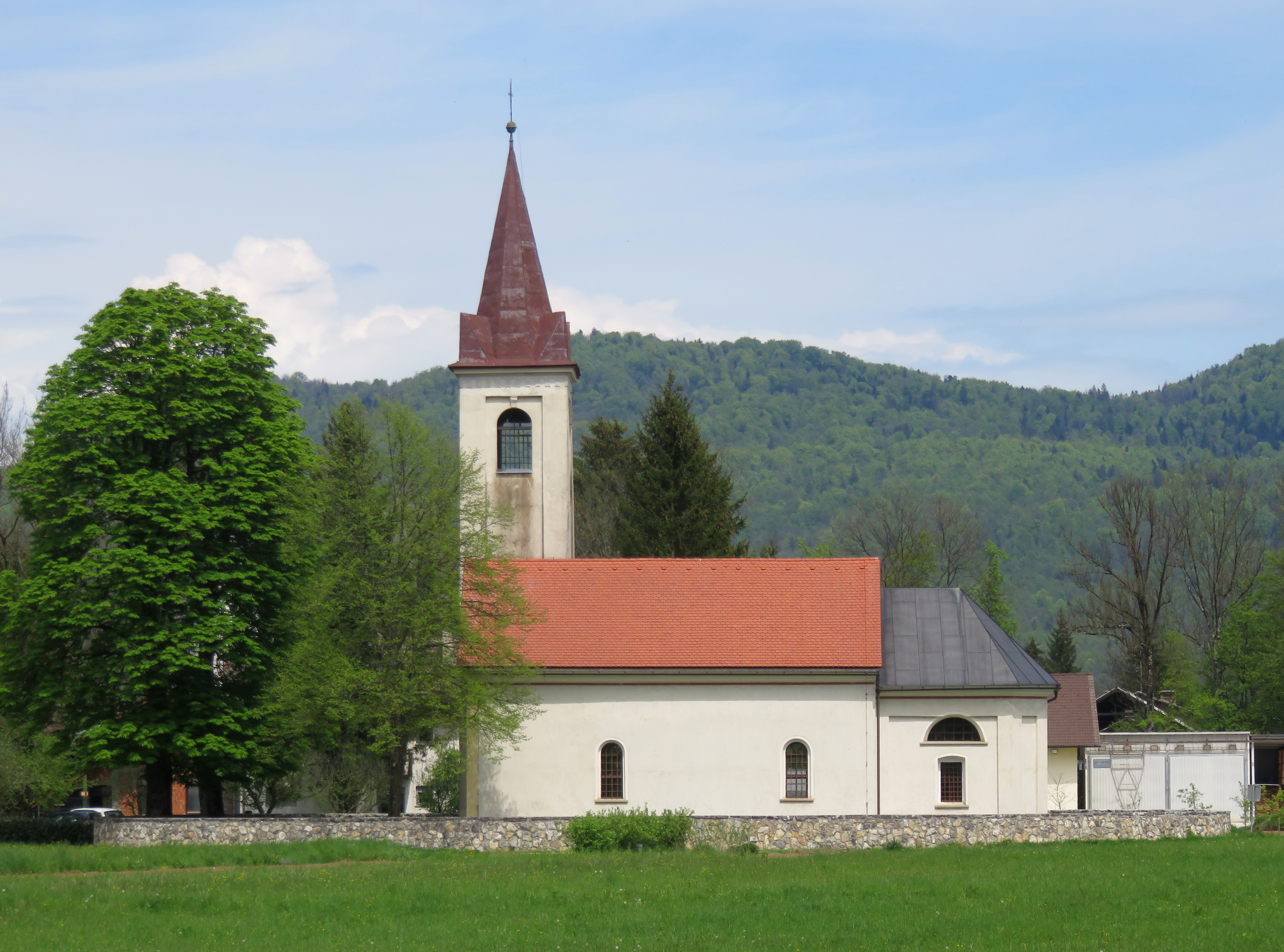
Holy Name of Mary Church

The local church, built outside the village to the south, is dedicated to the Holy Name of Mary (Slovene: Ime Marijino) and belongs to the Parish of Ribnica. It is a medieval building with 16th- and 19th-century additions.
