= Vital Ahačič =

Slovenian accordionist

- Born: 16 April 1933; Tržič, Slovenia
- Died: 19 April 1995 (aged 62); Ljubljana, Slovenia
- Occupations: Accordionist; pedagogue

Vital Ahačič (16 April 1933 – 19 April 1995) was a Slovenian accordionist and pedagogue. He began his career with the music group Zadovoljni Krajnci and established a trio with Milan Ferlež and Boris Vede. Ahačič published three cassettes with his sister Marija Ahačič Pollak and more than 500 compositions of him are recorded.

Ahačič died on 19 April 1995 in Ljubljana, Slovenia.
