= Janko Ravnik =

Pianist

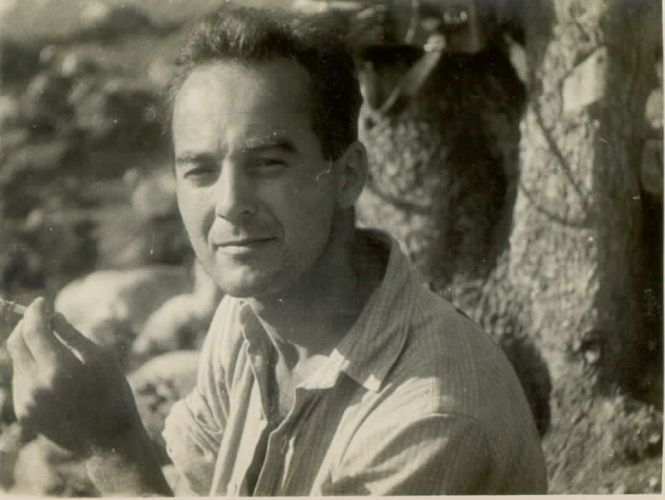
Janko Ravnik

Janko Ravnik (7 March 1891 – 2 September 1981) was a Slovenian pianist, teacher, film director and composer.

He was born in Bohinjska Bistrica and died in Ljubljana. In 1928 and 1929, he filmed In the Kingdom of the Goldhorn (Slovene: V kraljestvu Zlatoroga), the first Slovene feature film. It features the ascent of a group of students to the top of Mount Triglav. In 1929, Ravnik filmed a great national ceremony in Ljubljana on the 120th anniversary of the establishment of the Illyrian Provinces, during which a monument was erected to Napoleon and Illyria at French Revolution Square. One of his pupils was Pavel Šivic.
