= Lucijan Marija Škerjanc =

Slovene composer and writer (1900–1973)

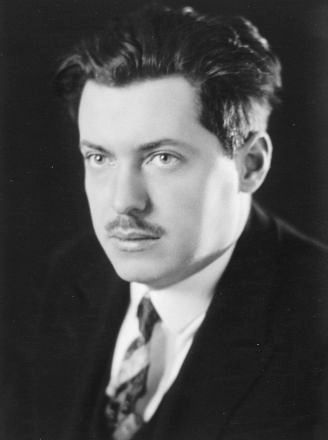
Lucijan Marija Škerjanc in the 1920s

Lucijan Marija Škerjanc (December 17, 1900 – February 27, 1973) was a Slovene composer, music pedagogue, conductor, musician, and writer who was accomplished on and wrote for a number of musical instruments such as the piano, violin and clarinet. His style reflected late romanticism with qualities of expressionism and impressionism in his pieces, often with a hyperbolic artistic temperament, juxtaposing the dark against melodic phrases in his music.

Škerjanc belongs among the most important older composers of modern Slovene music and is a key Slovenian music personality of the 20th century. He received the Prešeren Award for his work four times. In 1949, on December 6, he became a regular member of the Slovenian Academy of Sciences and Arts (SAZU).

== Biography ==
Škerjanc was born in Graz. He studied in Ljubljana, Prague, Vienna, Paris and Basel. He spent many years teaching composition at the Ljubljana Academy of Music, teaching composers such as Nada Ludvig-Pečar and Mirca Župnek Sancin whilst serving as a chancellor for a period and was a pianist, conductor, music writer, and director of the Slovenian Philharmonic Orchestra based in the country's capital. He died in Ljubljana.

== Work ==
Škerjanc was liberal in his attitude to music and multifaceted in his works. Whilst musically diverse, his opus centred on composition, varying from piano miniatures and solos for beginners, and solo and chamber works to full blown concertos and symphonies. Apart from sonatas, he notably composed a cycle of seven nocturnes, which many consider his greatest piano oriented work, and seven orchestral pieces Gazele (Ghazels). He not only composed for the piano but also the violin, the clarinet and the bassoon in 1952. During his life he also wrote for international composers and composed the film scores for a number of films under Yugoslavia.

Škerjanc was also a music critic and he wrote about music. He authored three volumes on Slovene composers, five textbooks, and the book Od Bacha do Šostakoviča (From Bach to Shostakovich).

== Awards and commemoration ==
Škerjanc received the Prešeren Award four times, in 1947 for his Concert for Violin and Orchestra (Slovene: Koncert za violino in orkester), and then again in 1948, 1950, and 1971. He was also a recipient of the Austrian Herder Award and the French Palmes académiques.

In 2001, he was commemorated by appearing on a postage stamp of Slovenia which featured a portrait of him by Božidar Jakac against the manuscript of his symphonic poem Marenka.

== Works ==
Orchestra

- Lirična uvertura (Lyric Overture) for orchestra (1925)
- Concerto for orchestra (1926)
- Slavnostna uvertura (Festive Ouverture) for orchestra (1932)
- Preludio, Aria and Finale for string orchestra (1933)
- Symphony No.1 (1933)
- "V onom cernom lese ..." for string orchestra (1934)
- Jadransko morje (Adriatic Sea) for string orchestra (1935)
- Suita v starem slogu (Suite in Old Style) for string orchestra (1935)
- Symphony No.2 in B minor (1938)
- Suite No.2 for string orchestra (1940)
- Mařenka, choreographic symphonic poem (1940)
- Symphony No.3 (1941)
- Dramatična uvertura (Dramatic Overture) for orchestra (1942)
- Symphony No.4 in B major for string orchestra (1942)
- Symphony No.5 in F minor for symphony orchestra (1943)
- Notturno
- Gazele (Gazelles, Ghazels), cycle of 7 orchestral poems after France Prešeren (1950)
- Suite No.3, 9 Pieces for string orchestra (1954)
- Mala suita (1956)
- Sinfonietta (Dixtuor) for strings (1958)
- Problemi (1958)
- Sedem dvanajsttonskih fragmentov (7 Twelve-tone Fragments) for string orchestra (1958)
- Svečana uvertura (Solemn Overture) for orchestra (1962)
- Zarje večerne (Evening Dawns) for orchestra (1972)

Concertante

- Concerto for violin and orchestra No.1 (1927)
- Concerto for piano and orchestra in A minor (1940)
- Concerto for violin and orchestra No.2 (1944)
- Fantazija (Fantasy) for piano and orchestra (1944)
- Koncertni allegro (Concert Allegro) for cello and orchestra (1947)
- Concertino for piano and string orchestra (1949)
- Concertino for clarinet and orchestra (1949)
- Concerto for bassoon with strings and harp (1952)
- Concerto for harp and chamber orchestra (1954)
- Concerto for clarinet with strings, percussion and harp (1958)
- Koncertantna rapsodija (Concertant Rhapsody) for viola and orchestra (1959)
- Concertino for flute and orchestra (1962)
- Concerto for piano left hand and orchestra (1963)

Chamber music

- String Quartet No.1 (1917)
- String Quartet No.2 (1921)
- String Quartet No.3 (1925)
- Woodwind Quintet (1925)
- Intermezzo romantique for violin and piano (1934)
- Sonata for cello solo (1935)
- String Quartet No.4 (1935)
- Maestoso lugubre for piano trio (1935)
- Piano Trio (1935)
- Trio for flute, clarinet and bassoon (1937)
- Dve bagateli (2 Bagatelles) for violin and piano (1941)
- Tri mladinske skladbe (Three Youth Compositions) for violin (or clarinet, trumpet, cello) and piano (1942)
- String Quartet No.5 (1945)
- String Quintet (1950)
- Duo for 2 violins (1952)
- Pet liričnih melodij in Capriccio (Five Lyrical Melodies and Capriccio) for cello and piano (1953)
- Concertone for 4 cellos (1954)
- Štiri ditirambične skladbe (4 Dithyrambic Pieces) for violin and piano (1960)
- Sedem etud (7 Etudes) for cello solo (1961)
- Elegija (Elegy) for viola and piano

Keyboard

- Sonata for piano (published 1956)
- Sonata No.2 for piano (1925)
- Štiri klavirske skladbe (4 Piano Pieces) (1925)
- Deset mladinskih skladbic (Ten Youth Compositions) for piano
- Pro memoria for piano (1927)
- Sedem nokturnov (7 Nocturnes) for piano (1935)
- 24 diatoničnih preludijev (24 Diatonic Preludes) (1936)
- 6 improvizacij (6 Improvisations) for piano (1942)
- Prelude and Fugue in E Minor for organ (1944)
- Varijacije brez teme (Variations without a theme) for piano (1944)
- Šest skladb za eno roko (6 Pieces for One Hand) (1945); 3 pieces for the left hand, three for the right
- Dvanajst preludijev (Twelve preludes) for piano (1954)

Vocal

- Vizija (Vision), solo song for high voice and piano (1918)
- Sonetni venec, Cantata for soloists, chorus and orchestra (1949); words by France Prešeren
- De profundis for voice and chamber orchestra
- choral works
- 55 songs for voice and piano
