= Academy of Music (Ljubljana) =

Musical academy in Ljubljana, Slovenia

Academy of Music of the University of Ljubljana
- Akademija za glasbo Univerze v Ljubljani
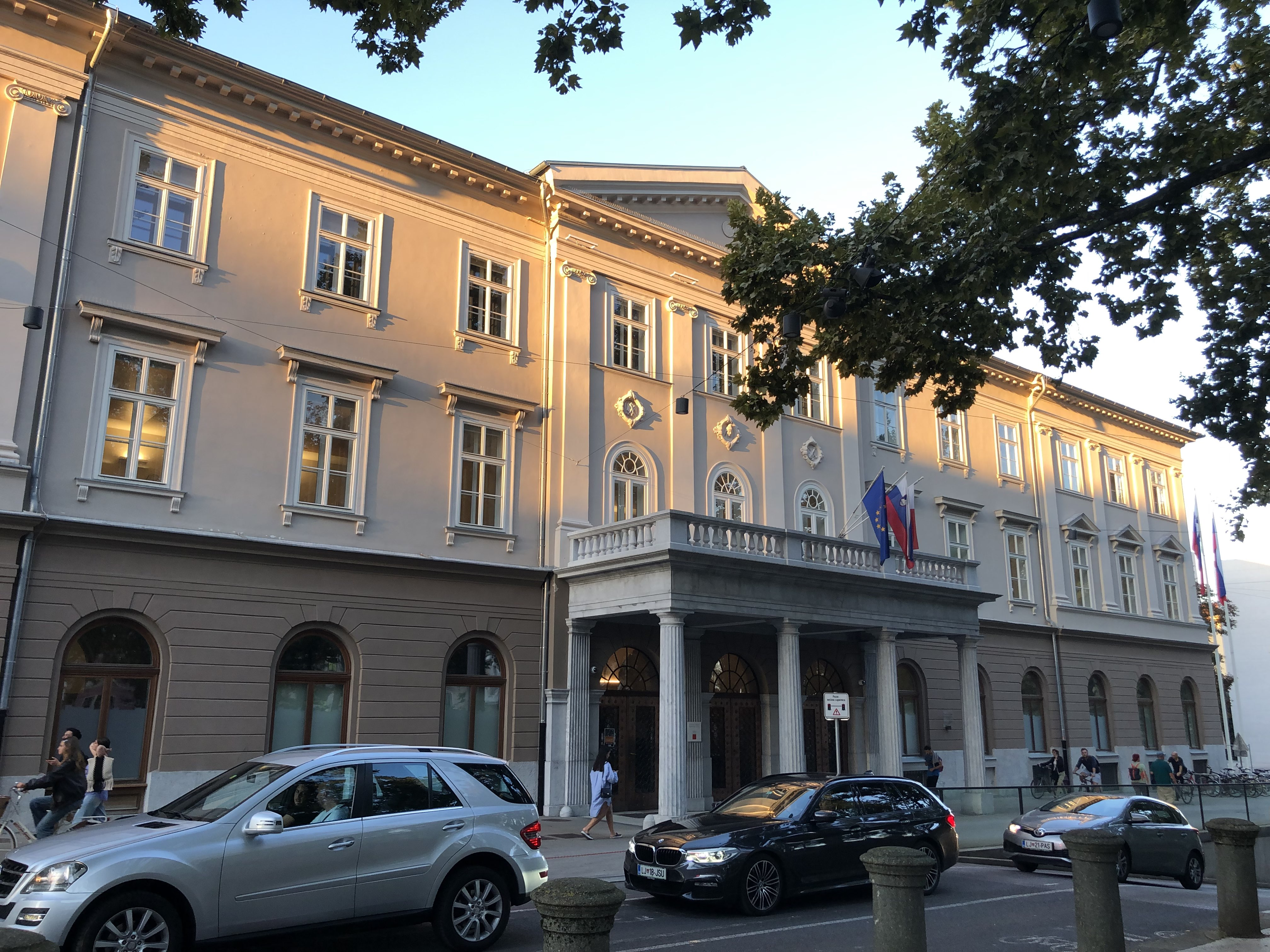
- Type: Music academy
- Established: 21 July 1921; 104 years ago
- Location: Ljubljana, Slovenia; 46°03′03″N 14°30′12″E
- Website: www.ag.uni-lj.si

The Academy of Music of the University of Ljubljana (Slovene: Akademija za glasbo Univerze v Ljubljani) is the largest and only music conservatoire in Slovenia. The academy has its origin in the Music School of the Slovene Philharmonic Society (founded 1821, indirectly descended from the Ljubljana Philharmonic Academy of Johann Berthold von Höffer, 1701), which became the basis of the Ljubljana Conservatoire in 1919, and then the Ljubljana Academy of Music in 1939. The secondary programme became an independent institution as the Ljubljana Music and Ballet Conservatory in 1953.

== Former and current deans of the academy ==
- Julij Betetto (1933–1940)
- Anton Trost (1940–?)
- Leon Pfeifer
- Lucijan Marija Škerjanc (1946–1947)
- Marijan Lipovšek
- Franjo Schiffer
- Karlo Rupel
- Janko Ravnik
- Mihael Gunzek (1976–1979)
- Danijel Škerl (–1986)
- Marjan Gabrijelčič (1986–1994)
- Dejan Bravničar (1994–2002)
- Pavel Mihelčič (2002–2009)
- Andrej Grafenauer (2009–2017)
- Marko Vatovec (2017–2025)
- Karolina Šantl Zupan (current)
