= List of Slovenian musical artists and groups =

This is a list of notable Slovenian musical groups

== A ==
- Adi Smolar - folk pop rock
- Alenka Godec - pop
- Alenka Gotar - ethno pop, pop
- Alya - pop
- Ana Pupedan - pop
- Anzej Dezan - pop
- Anja Rupel - pop
- Atomik Harmonik - turbo-folk-pop
- Avsenik Brothers Ensemble - polka

== B ==
- Big Foot Mama - pop rock
- Billysi - pop rock
- Borghesia - early ebm
- Buldožer - rock

== Č ==
- Čedahuči - folk rock

== D ==
- Dan D - rock

== G ==
- Gal Gjurin - pop
- Gramatik - Chillhop, instrumental hip hop, downtempo

== H ==
- Helena Blagne Zaman - pop

== I ==
- Iztok Mlakar - folk

== J ==
- Joker Out - indie rock

== K ==
- Karmen Stavec - pop
- Klemen Klemen - rap

== L ==
- Lačni Franz - rock, Yugoslavian new wave, progressive
- Laibach - industrial
- Lara-B - modern rock

== M ==
- Maja Keuc - pop
- Majda Sepe - popular
- Maraaya – pop, R&B, soul
- Melodrom - alternative, electro
- Mi2 (band) - rock
- Murat & Jose - hip hop

== N ==
- N'Toko - rap
- Neisha - pop
- Negligence (band) - metal
- Niet - punk rock
- Nikolovski - rap
- Nuša Derenda - pop/popular

== O ==
- Omar Naber - pop-rock
- Orlek - folk rock
- Oto Pestner - pop, gospel

== P ==
- Pankrti - punk rock
- Peter Lovšin - rock
- Prospect - progressive metal
- PureH - experimental

== R ==
- Robert Pešut Magnifico - folk-pop

== S ==
- Sestre - pop
- Siddharta - pop rock
- Slon in Sadež - various, humorous
- Severa Gjurin - pop

== Š ==
- Šank Rock - rock

== T ==
- Tomaž Pengov - folk
- Turbo Angels - turbo folk
- Trash Candy - pop punk
- Trkaj - rap
- Top Stripper - hard rock

== V ==
- Vlado Kreslin - folk rock
- Videosex - new wave

== W ==
- Within Destruction - deathcore, slam

== Z ==
- Zablujena generacija - punk rock
- Zaklonišče prepeva - punk/rock
- Zmelkoow - rock
- Zoran Predin - rock
