= Amo Socialec =

Amo
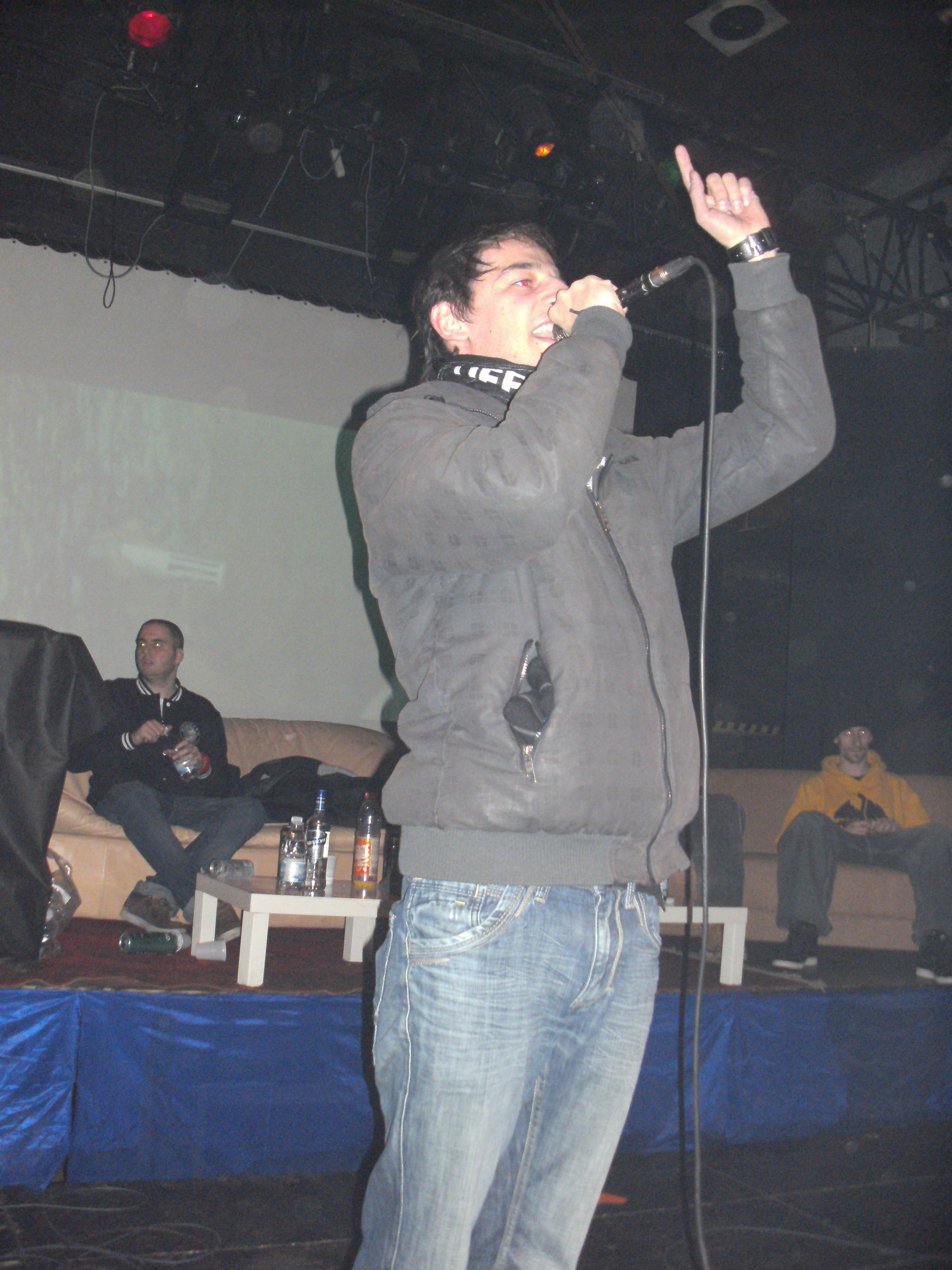
- Amo Socialec performing on stage live

Background information
- Birth name: Mišel Ristov
- Origin: Maribor and Ptuj, Slovenia
- Genres: Conscious hip hop, rap, hardcore hip hop
- Years active: 2009–present
- Labels: Infected Records; Wudisban Records

Mišel Ristov, better known by his stage name Amo often prolonged to Amo Socialec, is a Slovenian rapper, writer, slam poet, actor and entrepreneur from Ptuj, Slovenia, who works as a social worker in a hospital.

== Early life ==
Amo was raised mostly in the Maribor area, but constantly moved in various locations throughout the country.

== Career ==
In 2009, Amo entered the National Freestyle Battle Championship and placed second. In the final he lost to the unbeaten two-time champion, N'toko. He released his street album titled 'Horizont' the following year. He had several successful battle appearances afterwards, winning multiple competitions in the battle circuit around the Country. In 2012 he was one of the 12 emcees to be signed to the first Slovenian hip hop label, Wudisban Records. Despite that, he would later go on to compete and win the National Championship in 2013, defeating the former freestyle champion, Unknown in the final.

== Slam poetry ==
While in high school, Ristov first got intrigued in slam poetry, by watching performances of Saul Williams and began extensively writing his own poetry. It wasn't until the end of 2015, when he was working at a local youth club, that he decided to organize a small scale poetry slam event. Coincidentally, such events were held for the first time in cities such as Maribor, Kamnik, Celje as well, so he became a leader of Ptuj's slam poetry scene. As a competitor, he became the champion in the second edition of Slovenian championship in slam poetry in 2017 and thus, represented Slovenia at the European championship in Brussels.

== Acting ==
Ristov has also involved himself in acting through various theatre roles and debuted in the full feature "Utrip Ljubezni", in 2015.

== Discography ==
- Horizont (2010)
- Sončni Mrk (unreleased)(2010)
- LowBadžetKrismesTejp EP (2011)
- Biohazard (unreleased) (2012)
- En dan... (2016)
- #projektVida (EP) (2019)
- Sad Porn EP (collaboration with LAV) (2021)
