= JCVD (disambiguation) =

JCVD is an initialism standing for Jean-Claude Van Damme.

JCVD may also refer to

- JCVD (film)
- "JCVD" (Jul song)
- "JCVD" (Ledeni song)
- "JCVD" (commercial)
