= Miha Blazic =

Miha Blazic may refer to:

- Miha Blažič (footballer) (born 1993), Slovenian football defender
- N'toko, whose real name is Miha Blažič (born 1980), Slovenian rapper
