= Slovenian hip-hop =

Slovenian hip hop refers to hip hop within Slovenia.

== History ==
According to some accounts, the roots of Slovenian hip hop can be traced back to 1978, but all rappers from that time were forgotten or disappeared. What remains of this early history is preserved in little-circulated album releases. The mid-1980s were marked as the breakthrough of rap music in Slovenia. Hip hop dancing in Slovenia is sometimes called "Čefur" dance (derogatory term for non-Slovenian South Slavic people). Ali-En released the first rap album, that immediately became a classic, in 1994.

In 1997, rap duo Dandrough released Ko pride Bog ('when God comes'). The next few years there was a small hole in the hip hop scene, with only a couple of albums released up until 2000. Hip hop culture was heavily popularized by Slovenian Olympic champion skier Jure Košir, who also released an album Kartelova teorija (eng: cartel theory) with his crew Pasji Kartel (eng: Dog Cartel) in 1998. Klemen Klemen released one of the most influential mainstream Slovenian hip hop albumsTrnow Stajl (eng: Trnovo Style) on Nika Records. At about the same time, Radyoyo: Za narodov Blagor - 5'00" of fame, the first compilation of Slovenian hip hop music was released, including various new and unknown rappers on the scene.

In 2001, the first Slovenian freestyle rap championship was organized, launching rapper 6pack Čukur, who placed 2nd, into the mainstream. The competition became a tradition and has been held every second year since then. The next year rap duo Murat & Jose released V besedi je moč, which became one of the most successful rap albums in Slovenia and Southern Europe. The following year's freestyle championship spawned 2 champions - Trkaj, an alternative rapper and N'toko - who both went on to release albums through Nika Records.

The most productive years for Slovenian hip hop were 2004–2006, spawning more albums than all years before that together. Though the quality oscillated from album to album, mostly because of the unofficial releases - noting that the demo scene produced better tracks.
