= Slovenia in the Eurovision Song Contest 2008 =

- Eurovision Song Contest 2008
- Participating broadcaster: Radiotelevizija Slovenija (RTVSLO)
- Country: Slovenia
- Selection process: Evrovizijska Melodija 2008
- Selection date: 3 February 2008

Competing entry
- Song: "Vrag naj vzame"
- Artist: Rebeka Dremelj
- Songwriters: Josip Miani-Pipi; Igor Amon Mazul

Placement
- Semi-final result: Failed to qualify (11th)

Participation chronology

Slovenia was represented at the Eurovision Song Contest 2008 with the song "Vrag naj vzame", composed by Josip Miani-Pipi, with lyrics by Igor Amon Mazul, and performed by Rebeka Dremelj. The Slovene participating broadcaster, Radiotelevizija Slovenija (RTVSLO), organised the national final Evrovizijska Melodija 2008 (EMA 2008) in order to select its entry for the contest. 20 entries competed in the national final which consisted of three shows: two semi-finals and a final. The top five entries were selected to advance from each semi-final based on a public televote. Ten entries qualified to compete in the final where the winner was selected over two rounds of public televoting. In the first round, the top two entries were selected. In the second round, "Vrag naj vzame" performed by Rebeka Dremelj was selected as the winner entirely by a public televote.

Slovenia was drawn to compete in the first semi-final of the Eurovision Song Contest which took place on 20 May 2008. Performing during the show in position 8, "Vrag naj vzame" was not announced among the 10 qualifying entries of the first semi-final and therefore did not qualify to compete in the final. It was later revealed that Slovenia placed eleventh out of the 19 participating countries in the semi-final with 36 points.

== Background ==
Prior to the 2008 contest, Radiotelevizija Slovenija (RTVSLO) had participated in the Eurovision Song Contest representing Slovenia thirteen times since its first entry in 1993. Its highest placing in the contest, to this point, has been seventh place, achieved on two occasions: in 1995 with the song "Prisluhni mi" performed by Darja Švajger, and in 2001 with the song "Energy" performed by Nuša Derenda. Its only other top ten result was achieved in 1997 when "Zbudi se" by Tanja Ribič placed tenth. Since the introduction of semi-finals to the format of the contest in 2004, it had thus far only managed to qualify to the final on one occasion. In 2007, "Cvet z juga" performed by Alenka Gotar qualified to the final and placed fifteenth.

As part of its duties as participating broadcaster, RTVSLO organises the selection of its entry in the Eurovision Song Contest and broadcasts the event in the country. The broadcaster confirmed its participation in the 2008 contest on 10 October 2007. The broadcaster has traditionally selected its entry through a national final entitled Evrovizijska Melodija (EMA), which has been produced with variable formats. For 2008, the broadcaster opted to organise EMA 2008 to select its entry.

== Before Eurovision ==
=== EMA 2008 ===
EMA 2008 was the 13th edition of the Slovenian national final format Evrovizijska Melodija (EMA). The competition was used by RTVSLO to select its entry for the Eurovision Song Contest 2008, and consisted of three shows that commenced on 1 February 2008 and concluded on 3 February 2008. All shows in the competition took place at the Gospodarsko razstavišče in Ljubljana and were broadcast on TV SLO 1 and online via the broadcaster's website rtvslo.si. The final was also broadcast on Radio Val 202.

==== Format ====
The format of the competition consisted of three televised shows: two semi-finals held on 1 and 2 February 2008 and a final held on 3 February 2008. Ten songs competed in each semi-final and public televoting exclusively determined five finalists to proceed to the final. Ten songs competed in the final where the winner was selected over two rounds of public televoting. In the first round, two songs were selected out of the sixteen competing songs to proceed to a superfinal, during which the winner was determined.

==== Competing entries ====
Artists and composers were able to submit their entries to the broadcaster between 10 October 2007 and 30 November 2007. A record 162 entries were received by the broadcaster during the submission period. An expert committee consisting of Elza Budau (lyricist), Andrej Šifrer (singer-songwriter), Vojko Sfiligoj (musician and composer), Samo Koler (public representative), and Igor Pirkovič (RTVSLO Eurovision project manager) selected twenty artists and songs for the competition from the received submissions. The competing artists were announced on 11 December 2007. On 4 January 2008, "Eo eo", written by Aleš Zibelnik, Matej Vidovič, and Urša Mravlje and to have been performed by Zaka' pa ne, was disqualified due to the song having been publicly released before the competition and replaced with "Samara" performed by Brigita Šuler. On 22 January 2008, "Extrem", written and to have been performed by Petra Pečovnik, was disqualified due to plagiarism and replaced with the song "Dober planet" performed by Cole and Predsednik; Cole had represented Slovenia in 1993 as a member of 1X Band.

Artist	Song	Songwriter(s)
4Play	"DJ"	Miha Hercog, Igor Amon Mazul
Andraž Hribar	"Corpomorto (Jutri jadram naprej)"	Andraž Hribar
Brigita Šuler	"Samara"	Werner Brozovič, Andreja Brozovič
Cole and Predsednik	"Dober planet"	Josip-Cole Moretti, Miklavž Ašič, Jože Andrejaš
Dennis	"Ni me sram"	Denis Vučak, Zvone Tomac
Eva Černe	"Dovolj"	Boštjan Grabnar, Damjana Kenda Hussu
Halgato Band	"Nomadi"	Milan Ostojić, Feri Lainšček
Iris	"Peti element"	Sabina Hribernik, Saša Lendero
Johnny Bravo	"Butn ..., butn!!!"	Leon Oblak
Langa and Civili	"Za svobodo divjega srca"	Mišo Kontrec, Feri Lainšček
Male malice	"Spam"	Tadej Vasle
Manca Špik	"Še vedno nekaj čutim"	Raay, Urša Vlašič
Mirna Reynolds	"Lepi fantje"	Robi Povše, Mirna Reynolds
Neža Trobec	"Prav ti"	Borut Praper, Rok Predin
Rebeka Dremelj	"Vrag naj vzame"	Josip Miani-Pipi, Igor Amon Mazul
Slovenia United and Grupa občanov	"Kako je ne bi imel rad"	Jurjev Kolk
Stereotipi	"Naravnost v srce"	Dare Kaurič, Janez Rupnik
Tina Gačnik - Tiana	"Povej!"	Bor Zuljan, Leon Oblak
Turbo Angels	"Zabava"	Ed Fisher, Boštjan Groznik
Ylenia	"Našel si me"	Marino Legovič, Damjana Kenda Hussu

==== Semi-finals ====
The two semi-finals of EMA 2008 took place on 1 and 2 February 2008. The first semi-final was hosted by Lorella Flego and Peter Poles, while the second semi-final was hosted by Tjaša Hrobat and Jure Sešek. In addition to the performances of the competing entries, LeeLooJamais, Aleksandra Kovač and Neisha performed as guests during the first semi-final, while Trkaj, Alya, Nikolovski and Regina, who had represented Slovenia in 1996, performed as guests during the second semi-final. A public televote selected five entries to proceed to the final from each semi-final.

Semi-final 1 – 1 February 2008
R/O	Artist	Song	Televote	Place
1	Langa and Civili	"Za svobodo divjega srca"	7,176	1
2	Slovenia United and Grupa občanov	"Kako je ne bi imel rad"	1,463	8
3	Mirna Reynolds	"Lepi fantje"	379	10
4	Dennis	"Ni me sram"	1,354	9
5	Cole and Predsednik	"Dober planet"	1,742	5
6	Andraž Hribar	"Corpomorto (Jutri jadram naprej)"	1,467	7
7	Turbo Angels	"Zabava"	2,983	3
8	Ylenia	"Našel si me"	1,580	6
9	Manca Špik	"Še vedno nekaj čutim"	1,831	4
10	Johnny Bravo	"Butn ..., butn!!!"	4,683	2

Semi-final 2 – 2 February 2008
R/O	Artist	Song	Televote	Place
1	Stereotipi	"Naravnost v srce"	1,831	8
2	Rebeka Dremelj	"Vrag naj vzame"	3,541	3
3	Tina Gačnik - Tiana	"Povej!"	2,986	5
4	4Play	"DJ"	6,367	1
5	Halgato Band	"Nomadi"	1,525	9
6	Neža Trobec	"Prav ti"	631	10
7	Iris	"Peti element"	2,018	7
8	Brigita Šuler	"Samara"	3,413	4
9	Eva Černe	"Dovolj"	4,919	2
10	Male malice	"Spam"	2,247	6

==== Final ====
The final of EMA 2008 took place on 3 February 2008 and was hosted by Bernarda Žarn and Mario Galunič. In addition to the performances of the competing entries, Helena Blagne, Darja Švajger (who had represented Slovenia in 1995 and 1999), Nuša Derenda (who had represented Slovenia in 2001), and Alenka Gotar (who had represented Slovenia in 2007), performed as guests. The winner was selected over two rounds of public televoting. In the first round, two entries were selected to proceed to the second round. In the second round, "Vrag naj vzame" performed by Rebeka Dremelj was selected as the winner.

Final – 3 February 2008
R/O	Artist	Song	Televote	Place
1	Manca Špik	"Še vedno nekaj čutim"	3,432	9
2	Eva Černe	"Dovolj"	8,044	5
3	Langa and Civili	"Za svobodo divjega srca"	21,193	1
4	4Play	"DJ"	9,134	4
5	Johnny Bravo	"Butn ..., butn!!!"	6,192	7
6	Tina Gačnik - Tiana	"Povej!"	4,945	8
7	Cole and Predsednik	"Dober Planet"	3,189	10
8	Rebeka Dremelj	"Vrag naj vzame"	12,665	2
9	Turbo Angels	"Zabava"	7,914	6
10	Brigita Šuler	"Samara"	9,746	3

Superfinal – 3 February 2008
R/O	Artist	Song	Televote	Place
1	Langa and Civili	"Za svobodo divjega srca"	56,428	2
2	Rebeka Dremelj	"Vrag naj vzame"	56,823	1

==== Ratings ====
Viewing figures by show
Show	Air date	Viewing figures		Ref.
Show	Air date	Nominal	Share	Ref.
Final	3 February 2008	501,200	27.6%	

=== Promotion ===
Rebeka Dremelj made several appearances across Europe to specifically promote "Vrag naj vzame" as the Slovenian Eurovision entry. On 2 March, Rebeka Dremelj performed the song during the presentation show of the 2008 Bosnian Eurovision entry, BH Eurosong Show 2008. On 27 February, Dremelj performed the English version of the song, "Heavy Weather", during Greek Eurovision national final Ellinikós Telikós 2008. On 9 March, Dremelj performed "Vrag naj vzame" during the semi-final of the Serbian Eurovision national final Beovizija 2008. Dremelj also took part in promotional activities in Belgium and performed during an event held at the Place Sainte-Catherine/Sint-Katelijneplein in Brussels on 28 April.

== At Eurovision ==
It was announced in September 2007 that the competition's format would be expanded to two semi-finals in 2008. According to the rules, all nations with the exceptions of the host country and the "Big Four" (France, Germany, Spain, and the United Kingdom) are required to qualify from one of two semi-finals in order to compete for the final; the top nine songs from each semi-final as determined by televoting progress to the final, and a tenth was determined by back-up juries. The European Broadcasting Union (EBU) split up the competing countries into six different pots based on voting patterns from previous contests, with countries with favourable voting histories put into the same pot. On 28 January 2008, an allocation draw was held which placed each country into one of the two semi-finals. Slovenia was placed into the first semi-final, to be held on 20 May 2008. The running order for the semi-finals was decided through another draw on 17 March 2008 and Slovenia was set to perform in position 8, following the entry from Azerbaijan and before the entry from Norway.

In Slovenia, the semi-finals were televised on TV SLO 2 and the final was televised on TV SLO 1. Both shows featured commentary by Andrej Hofer. The contest was also broadcast via radio with all three shows airing on Radio Val 202. RTVSLO appointed Peter Poles as its spokesperson to announce the Slovenian votes during the final.

=== Semi-final ===
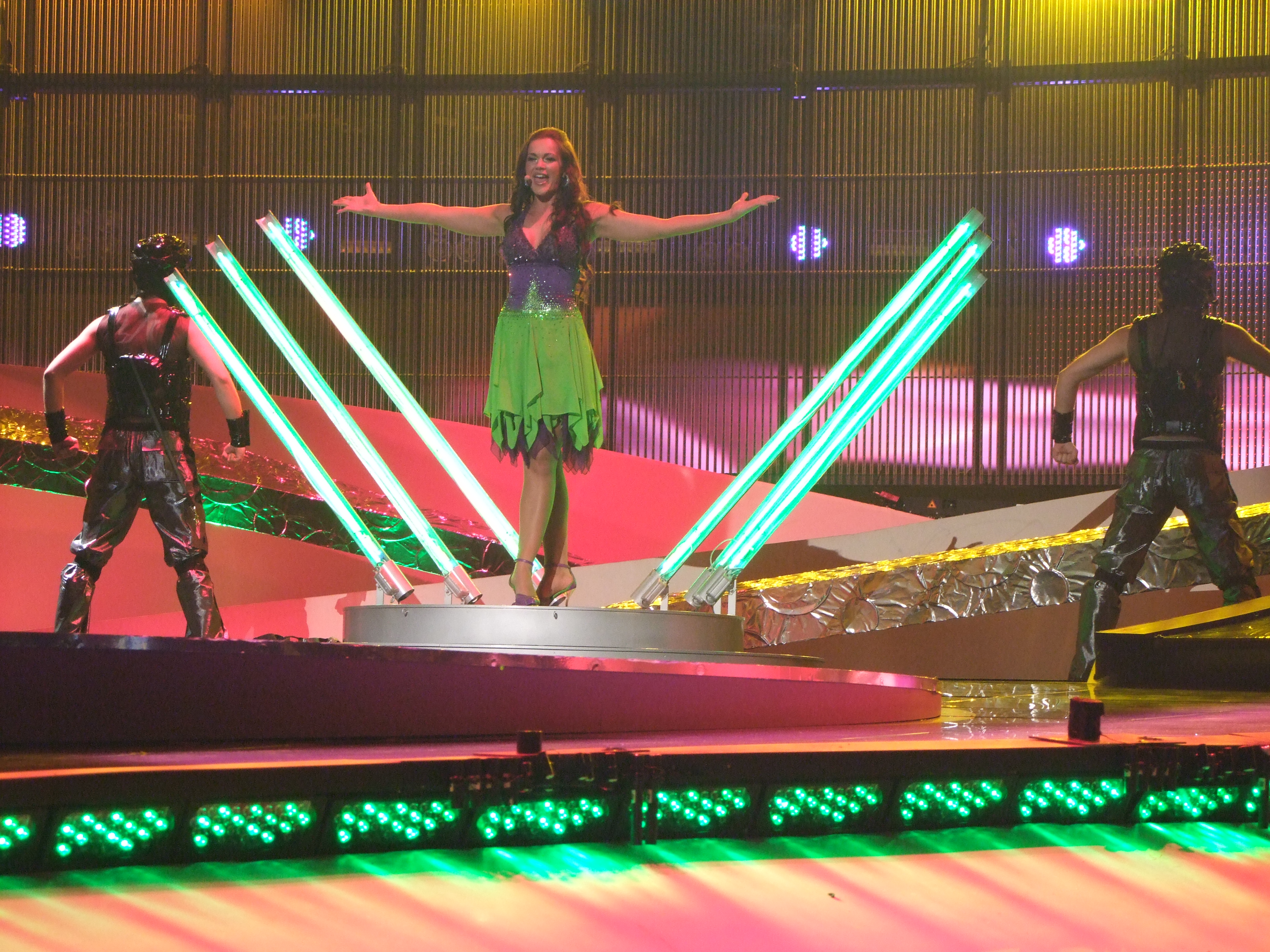
Rebeka Dremelj during a rehearsal before the first semi-final

Rebeka Dremelj took in technical rehearsals on 11 and 15 May, followed by dress rehearsals on 19 and 20 May. The Slovenian performance featured Dremelj emerging from a green-lit cage and performing in a cape, which was later removed to reveal a green-blue dress, together with two dancers in black latex and helmets. During the performance, Dremelj revealed a leash on her dancers which she took them with. The stage costumes for the performance were designed by Slovenian designer Urša Drofenik. Dremelj was joined by three on-stage backing vocalists: Jelena Majić, Marina Durović and Sandra Feketija. The two dancers that joined Dremelj on stage were Matej Bedič and Željko Božič, with the latter also choreographed the Slovenian performance.

At the end of the show, Slovenia was not announced among the ten qualifying entries in the first semi-final and therefore failed to qualify to compete in the final. It was later revealed that Slovenia placed eleventh in the semi-final, receiving a total of 36 points.

=== Voting ===
Below is a breakdown of points awarded to Slovenia and awarded by Slovenia in the first semi-final and grand final of the contest. The nation awarded its 12 points to Bosnia and Herzegovina in the semi-final and to Serbia in the final of the contest.

==== Points awarded to Slovenia ====
Points awarded to Slovenia (Semi-final 1)
Score	Country
12 points	
10 points	Bosnia and Herzegovina; Montenegro
8 points	
7 points	
6 points	
5 points	
4 points	Armenia
3 points	
2 points	Greece; Israel; Moldova; Poland; Russia
1 point	Azerbaijan; Romania

==== Points awarded by Slovenia ====
Points awarded by Slovenia (Semi-final 1)
Score	Country
12 points	Bosnia and Herzegovina
10 points	Montenegro
8 points	Greece
7 points	Russia
6 points	Romania
5 points	Armenia
4 points	Israel
3 points	Finland
2 points	Norway
1 point	Andorra

Points awarded by Slovenia (Final)
Score	Country
12 points	Serbia
10 points	Bosnia and Herzegovina
8 points	Croatia
7 points	Russia
6 points	Greece
5 points	Armenia
4 points	Albania
3 points	Israel
2 points	Ukraine
1 point	Azerbaijan
