= Mi2 (band) =

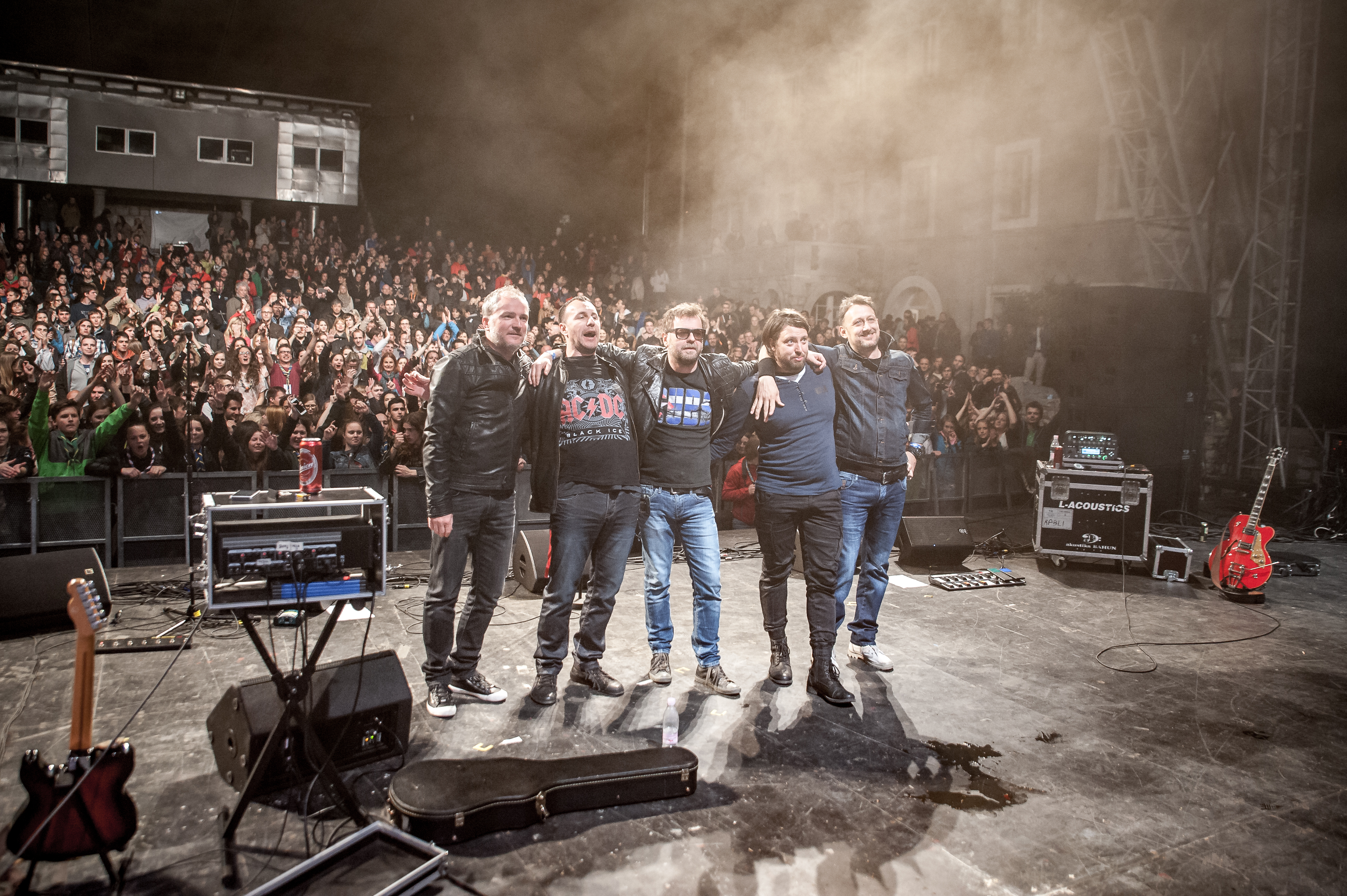
- MI2 in 2016

Background information
- Origin: Rogatec, Slovenia
- Genres: Rock
- Years active: 1995–present

Mi2 is a Slovenian rock band founded in Rogatec in 1995. The band's members include Jernej Dirnbek (guitarist and songwriter), Tone Kregar (singer and songwriter), Egon Herman (guitar), Robert Novak (bass guitar), and Igor Orač (percussion). Mi2 is a representative of Slovenian comedy rock music tradition that was established by Buldožer and is continued by other bands, such as Zmelkoow.

== Book ==
- Mohor, H. (2009) Biografija (Biography), Litera, Maribor, ISBN 9789616780094

== Discography ==
=== Singles ===
- Vstati in obstati
- Hči vaškega učitelja
- Stara duša
- Samo tebe te imam
- Pojdi z menoj v toplice
- Moja teta Estera
- Odhajaš
- Pa si šla
- Zbudi me za prvi maj
- Oda gudeki
- Črtica
- Ko bil sn še mali pizdun
- Sv. Margareta
- Sve ove godine
- Štajersko nebo
- Čakal sn te ko kreten
- Brigita (z Ulice Maršala Tita)
- Sladka kot med
- Ti nisi ta
- Ljubezen pod topoli

=== Albums ===
- Črtica (1996)
- Čudo tehnike (1999)
- Album leta (2000)
- Dečki s Sotle (2002)
- Dobrodošli na dvor (2006)
- Rokenrol (2010)
- Decibeli (2012)
- Čista jeba (2014)
- Črno na belem (2021)
