= Rebeka Dremelj =

Slovenian singer, actor and model

Rebeka Dremelj Škaler
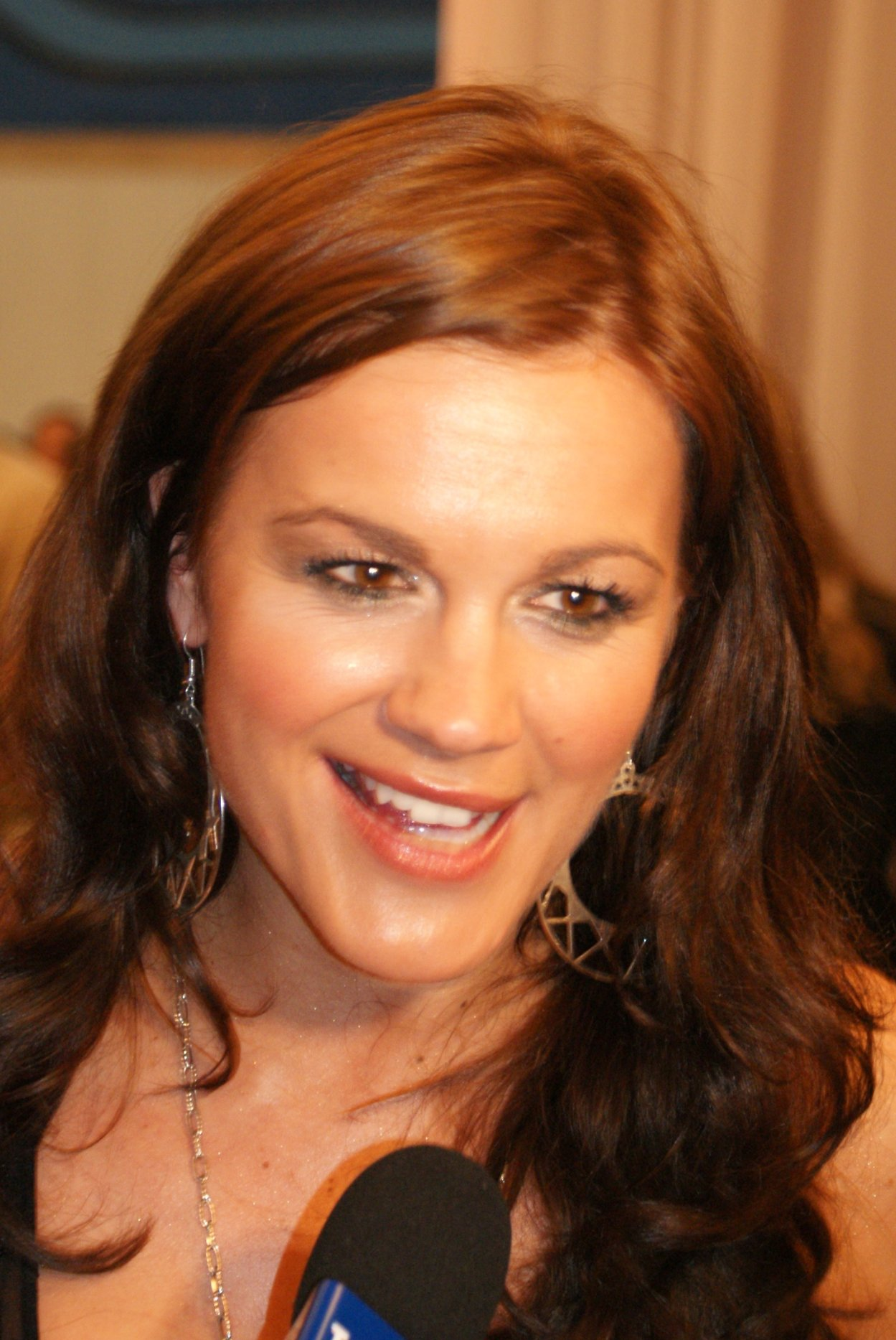
- Rebeka Dremelj

Background information
- Born: 25 July 1980 (age 46)
- Origin: Brežice, SR Slovenia, SFR Yugoslavia
- Occupations: Singer, model, TV host, fashion designer, actress
- Years active: 2001–present
- Labels: Menart, Hayat Production
- Website: rebekadremelj.com

Rebeka Dremelj (born 25 July 1980) is a Slovene actress, TV host, singer, model, fashion designer and beauty pageant titleholder. She was chosen to represent Slovenia at the Eurovision Song Contest 2008 in Belgrade, Serbia, with the song "Vrag naj vzame".

== Professional and personal life ==
Rebeka Dremelj was born in Brežice, SR Slovenia, Yugoslavia. She became a singer and was selected as Miss Slovenia 2001. Dremelj participated in Miss World 2001 and at the Miss World Talent Show in 2001 she landed the second place and thus signed a contract with Sony Records London. Dremelj represented Slovenia in the Eurovision Song Contest 2008 where she did not make it through the final. Since 2011 Rebeka has been married to Sandi Škaler, and they have two children.

== Discography ==
=== Popular Singles ===
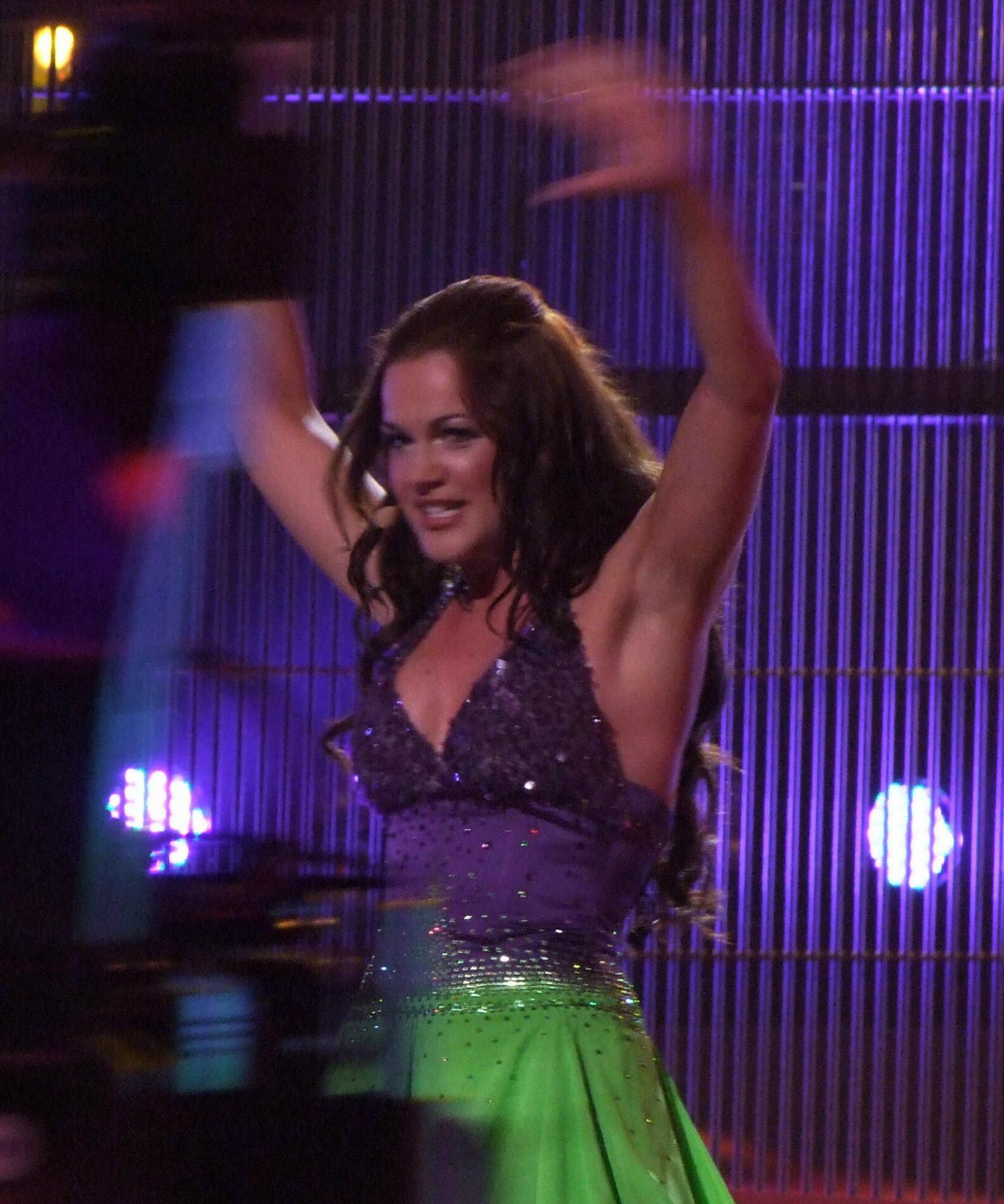
Rebeka Dremelj in Belgrade, 2008

- Ko ugasnejo luči
- Prvi korak
- Nisem kriva
- Ne ustavi se
- Ne boš se igral
- Pojdi z menoj
- To je prava noč
- Daj mi daj
- Slovenski superboy
- Vrag naj vzame
- Petek 13.
- Sončno dekle
- Ribica
- Brez obraza

=== Albums ===
- Prvi korak – 2002
- To sem jaz – 2004
- Pojdi z menoj – 2006
- Nepremagljiva – 2009
- Differo – 2010

Awards and achievements
Preceded by Maša Merc	Miss Slovenia; 2002	Succeeded by Nataša Krajnc
Preceded by Alenka Gotar with "Cvet z juga"	Slovenia in the Eurovision Song Contest; 2008	Succeeded by Quartissimo feat. Martina Majerle with "Love Symphony"
