= Turbo Polka =

Single by Atomik Harmonik

from the album Brizgaaaaj! Še več in dlje!
- Released: April 18, 2005
- Recorded: 2005
- Genre: Turbo folk
- Length: 3 min 26 s
- Label: Hansa Records

Atomik Harmonik singles chronology
"Na Seniku" (2005)	"Turbo Polka" (2005)	"Polkaholik" (2006)

Turbo Polka is a 2005 single by Slovenian group Atomik Harmonik. The song is a remixed version of their first hit "Brizgalna Brizga" with English lyrics, which differ from the original version. The remix for the song was contributed by Eiffel 65. It was a #34 hit in Germany and #64 in Austria.

== Track listing ==
- CD single
1. Turbo Polka (radio mix) (3:26)
2. Turbo Polka (radio extended) (5:22)
3. Turbo Polka (apres ski mix) (3:41)
4. Turbo Polka (dance mix) (3:58)
5. Turbo Polka (polka mix) (3:28)
6. Turbo Polka (karaoke mix) (3:26)
7. Brizgalna Brizga (original) (3:56)
8. Turbo Polka (joghurt splash mix) (2:55)

== Charts ==
Weekly chart performance for "Turbo Polka"
Chart (2005)	Peak position
Austria (Ö3 Austria Top 40)	64
Germany (GfK)	34
