= Slovenian Freestyle Battle Championship =

Slovenian rap competition

Slovenian Freestyle Battle Championship, commonly called just National Championship in Freestyle Battle ("Državno prvenstvo v freestyle Battlu), is a competition in Slovenia bringing rappers from all over the country to compete in freestyle battles. There is also an additional version of such competition that runs concurrently and has a longer history, but instead of using classical insulting battles, rappers are tested with various topics, given words, hidden objects and character plays that must all be inserted in their rapping.

== List of classic freestyle battle Champions ==
- 2009: N'toko
- 2013: Amo

== List of topical freestyle Champions ==
- 2001: N'toko
- 2003: N'toko and Trkaj (2 winners)
- 2005: Unknown
- 2008: Pižama
- 2011: Unknown
- 2015: Unknown

== See also ==
- Slovenian hip hop
- Freestyle rap
