= Brizgaaaaj! =

Studio album by Atomik Harmonik
- Released: 22 November 2004
- Recorded: 2004
- Length: 38:52
- Label: Menart Records

Atomik Harmonik chronology
Brizgaaaaj! (2004)	Vriskaaaj! (2006)

Brizgaaaaj! was the debut album of Slovenian pop folk band Atomik Harmonik. The lead single, "Brizgalna brizga", was a summer hit in Slovenia in the summer of 2004, and the album was released the following November. It was the number one album in Slovenia for 16 weeks. In 2005 the band released a second single, "Na seniku".

Brizgaaaaj!Še več in dlje!, an extended enhanced CD version of the album.

On 15 November 2005, Menart Records reissued the album as an enhanced CD. The reissue, called Brizgaaaaj! Še več in dlje!, included a new single called "Turbo Polka", music videos for all three singles, and two additional remixes. "Turbo Polka" is an English-language version of "Brizgalna brizga" intended for an international market. It reached number 34 in the German record charts, and peaked at number 64 in Austria. The music video for "Brizgalna brizga" was directed by Jani Pavec.

== Track listing ==
No.	Title	Length
1.	"Brizgalna brizga"	3:59
2.	"Hop Marinka"	3:35
3.	"Od hr'ma do hr'ma"	4:17
4.	"Turbopolkamixx"	6:40
5.	"Ena sama je… Slovenija"	4:07
6.	"Na seniku"	4:12
7.	"Venček valčkov"	8:10
8.	"Brizgalna brizga (DJ Rumek remix)"	3:52
9.	"Turbo Polka (radio mix)" (enhanced CD only)	3:26
10.	"Na seniku (DJ Rumek remix)" (enhanced CD only)	4:07
11.	"Od hr'ma do hr'ma (polka remix)" (enhanced CD only)	3:23
Total length:		49:48
