= Unknown MC =

Unknown is a Slovenian rapper and multiple freestyle battle champion from Ljubljana, Slovenia.

== Early career ==
Unknown first appeared on the Hip Hop Kuh'na in 2004, a compilation showcasing some of the best Slovenian rappers, composed and released by Nika records. At the time, he was only 17 years old.

== Freestyle champion ==
Unknown gained wider national recognition, when he won Slovenian Freestyle Battle Championship in 2005. Beating Zlatko in the final, he won a record deal with RapNika, at the time a subrecord company of Nika records, releasing exclusively hip hop music. He repeated this feat in 2011 and 2015, and is the only MC, next to N'toko, to win championships consecutively and three times altogether.

== Discography ==
- 2010: Rep za u žep
