= Turbo Angels =

Slovenian turbo-folk quartet

- Origin: Slovenia
- Genres: Turbo-folk (Polkatronica)
- Years active: 2005–2008
- Labels: Menart Records
- Members: Raay Aleš Vovk; Dejan Bojanec; Marjetka Jurkovnik; Maša Medik
- Past members: Dejan Gorenjec Raj (2005–2006)

Turbo Angels are a Slovenian turbo-folk quartet. Menart Records published their debut single, Naj se dviga, in 2005, and their debut album, Mi smo za..., in June 2006.

Dejan Bojanec replaced Dejan Gorenjec Raj as the band's diatonic accordion player in 2006, shortly before the release of Mi smo za..., which they had already recorded with Raj. Raj (age 24 at the time of his announcement) left Turbo Angels in March 2006, citing medical problems.

Turbo Angels' performance of their song "Zabava" ranked sixth in the finals for the 2008 EMA, Slovenia's national competition for Eurovision Song Contest 2008.

== See also ==
- Atomik Harmonik
- List of Slovenian musical artists and groups
- Music of Slovenia
- Slovenia in the Eurovision Song Contest 2008
