= Ledeni =

Ledeni aka Brrrski
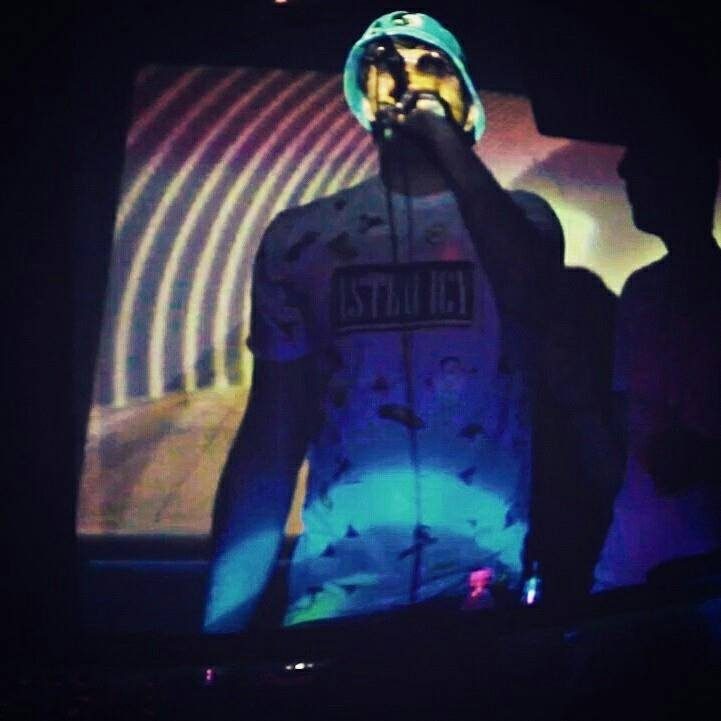

Background information
- Born: Damijan Kovačič
- Origin: Ljubljana, Slovenia
- Genres: Hip hop, trap, Electronic dance music, House Music, Techno Music
- Occupation(s): Rapper, Producer, DJ
- Years active: 2008–present

Damijan Kovačič known as Ledeni (a South Slavic trap/hip hop artist) and as Brrrski (electronic music producer and DJ) from Ljubljana, Slovenia.

== Career ==
Ledeni started recording demo songs as a teenager and in 2008 released his first mixtape Fixtape vol 1. In 2009 he was featured on the Spacedout compilation with the first trap song in Slovene, this song was his breakthrough on radio and television. Radio Val 202 labeled him as the future of Slovenian hip hop. Since then he is known as the first trap/rap artist from Slovenia. In 2010, he released another demo or mixtape Fixtape vol.2, where he experimented with new sounds and rapping styles. In 2012, he was signed to Menart Records for a short time and released a few commercial singles on that label. In 2013/2014 while trap music was mostly unknown or unpopular in Slovenia, he released videos "Peit dol niži", "Feder", "JCVD", and "Hejterji na kiti" on YouTube. The single "JCVD" was featured on Radio Študent 2013 Overall best music of the year. He also appeared on many television and radio programs and started performing in night clubs all over Slovenia. In 2015 he experimented with making music in English and his music videos like "Spvceship" were featured on globally known underground music YouTube channels. In 2016 he took a break from music, with the exception of live performances. On October 19, 2018, he released his first and only album as Ledeni "1100". The release concert for the album was sold out at KUD France Prešeren/Center Slovanskih Kultur and to this date the album all together received over 1,000,000 views/streams on all platforms(YouTube, Spotify, Apple Music etc.) He continued to perform live in Slovenia and on "Trapslavija" festivals in North Macedonia. In 2019 he started to DJ mostly trap and phonk music in local clubs and events in Ljubljana. While going through the first "Covid lockdown" he started to produce mostly electronic music.. In 2021 he announced that he will be focusing more on producing electronic music, audio engineering and DJing.Trap/hip hop projects as "Ledeni" will be occasional.
