= Brizgalna Brizga =

Single by Atomik Harmonik

from the album Brizgaaaaj!
- Released: September 21, 2004
- Recorded: 2004
- Genre: Turbo folk
- Length: 3 min 59 s
- Label: Menart Records

Atomik Harmonik singles chronology
"Brizgalna Brizga" (2004)	"Na Seniku" (2005)

"Brizgalna Brizga" was Atomik Harmonik's first hit. The song brought the band the Melodije morja in sonca televote award. It continued on to become the biggest summer hit in Slovenia in 2004.

In 2005 they later released a remixed version sung in English known as "Turbo Polka", with a Portuguese-language cover version known as "Festa Louca" performed by Brazilian band Os Montanari following in 2013.

== Track listing ==
1. Brizgalna Brizga (3:59)
2. Brizgalna Brizga (remix by DJ Umek) (3:52)
3. Brizgalna Brizga (karaoke) (3:58)
4. Brizgalna Brizga (video)
