= Anžej Dežan =

Slovenian singer

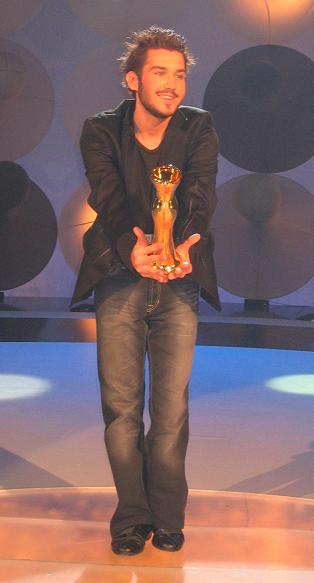

Background information
- Born: 17 June 1987 (age 37); Šentjur pri Celju, SFR Yugoslavia
- Genres: Pop, Dance
- Years active: 2005–present
- Website: http://www.anzej.com/

Anžej Dežan (born 17 June 1987) is a Slovenian singer.

== Biography ==
Anžej began his musical career by winning the TV show Karaoke only ten years old. His first major success though was in the 2005 talent show Spet Doma on RTV Slovenija, where he was the runner-up (beaten by Omar Naber, who got to represent Slovenia in Eurovision Song Contest 2005).

His growing potential was recognised by the successful composers and lyricists Urša and Matjaž Vlašič and Boštjan Grabnar, who became Anžej's creative team. Together with them, Anžej published his first single C'est la vie which was one of the top singles of several Slovenian radio playlists.

In February 2005, Anžej was a backing vocalist for Nuša Derenda at EMA, the Slovenian Eurovision preselection, while in May of the same year he entered the festival Melodije morja in sonca and cut his second single Vroče. The song received a great reception at the festival and the jury awarded him first place.

Anžej competed in the EMA 2006 with the song Plan B with 12 points awarded by the jury and 14 points awarded by the viewers. (The runner-up song performed by Saša Lendero was actually the one awarded the maximum points from the viewers but received no points from the jury.) As the winner, he got to represent Slovenia in the Eurovision Song Contest 2006 at which the song was sung in English and called Mr Nobody. It ended up in 16th place in the semi-final though, and thus failed to qualify to the final.

The song Plan B was also recorded in Serbian under the title Srce od Kristala. He claims that it's his own record.

== Albums ==
- C'est La Vie (That's Life)

== Singles ==
- C'est La Vie
- Vroče
- Plan B (Mr. Nobody)

== See also ==
- Slovenia in the Eurovision Song Contest 2006
- Eurovision Song Contest 2006

Awards and achievements
Preceded by Omar Naber with "Stop"	Slovenia in the Eurovision Song Contest; 2006	Succeeded by Alenka Gotar with "Cvet z juga"
