= Alenka Gotar =

Slovene operatic soprano

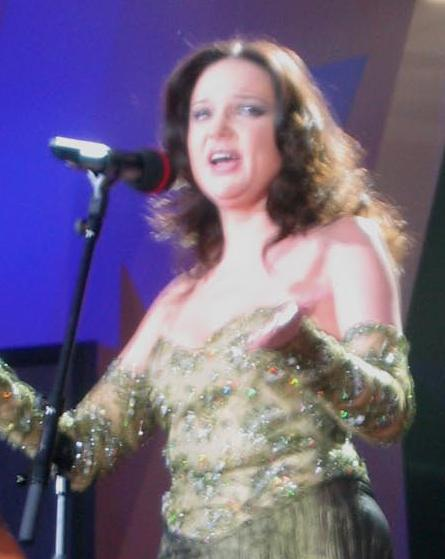

Background information
- Born: Alenka Gotar; 23 August 1977 (age 48); Rodica pri Domžalah, SR Slovenia, SFR Yugoslavia
- Genres: Opera, Operatic pop
- Occupation: Singer
- Instrument: Vocals
- Years active: 2000–present
- Website: alenkagotar.com

Alenka Gotar is a Slovene soprano singer, born in Rodica in 1977. With the song "Cvet z juga" ("Flower of the South"), she represented Slovenia in the Eurovision Song Contest 2007 in Helsinki, Finland. Achieving seventh place in the semi-final, she became the first Slovene to qualify to the grand final, where she ended fifteenth with 66 points.

== Biography ==
Alenka Gotar began her musical interest by attending a small music school where she learned piano and guitar. Afterwards, she attended music and ballet school in Ljubljana, where Markos Bajuk taught her solo singing. After graduating in 1996, she applied to study singing at the Musical Academy in Basel, Switzerland, and in 1999, she attended the Universität Mozarteum Salzburg, where she was taught by Lilijan Sukis. Alenka gained her diploma in 2000. In Salzburg, she continued studies in singing and opera with Sukis, along with perfecting her craft in Rome with Maya Sunari-Biankini, and with Marjana Lipovšek and Alfred Burgstaller. She gained her master's degree in 2006.

Alenka Gotar is a guest in the Maribor Opera and as a soloist, she sings in the state theatres in Salzburg and Ljubljana. She toured with an orchestra and chamber choir in Slovenia, Austria, Switzerland, Germany, Croatia, and Scandinavia. Her repertoire ranges from baroque to modern musical pieces. She also works as music teacher.

On 4 February 2007, Alenka Gotar won EMA 2007, the Slovenian national selection for Eurovision 2007. In Helsinki, during the semi-final on 10 May 2007, Alenka sang "Cvet z juga" and progressed to the finals, where she placed 15th with the same song. The song, described as a fast rhythmic ballad combined with operatic vocals, was written and composed by Andrej Babić and arranged by Aleksandra Valenčić. EMA 2007 was the edition of the competition to decide the winner completely by televoting. After two semi-finals and a final, the Slovenian public had a choice between Alenka and Eva Černe. With 44,636 votes, Alenka was crowned the winner and given the right to represent Slovenia at Eurovision.

During the 2018 Slovenian parliamentary election, Alenka Gotar stood as a parliamentary candidate for the Slovenian Democratic Party but, ultimately, did not gain a seat in the Slovenian National Assembly despite her party's victory in the election.

== Opera Roles ==
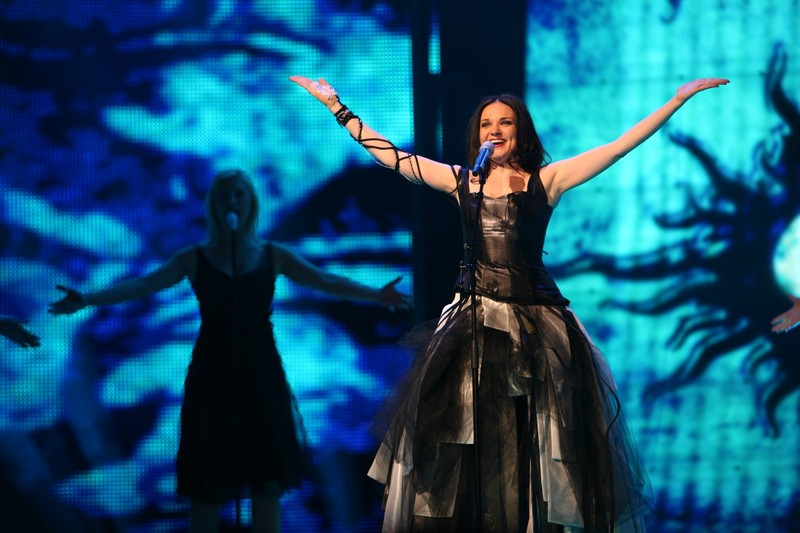
Alenka Gotar performing "Cvet z juga" for Slovenia, in the Eurovision Song Contest 2007.

From the summer of 2000, Alenka Gotar has been a frequent guest in the SNG opera and ballet in Ljubljana, where she has sung in the following roles:

- Barbarina (The Marriage of Figaro – Mozart);
- Donna Elvira (Don Giovanni – Mozart);
- Rusalka (Rusalka – Dvořák);
- Hanna Glawary (The Merry Widow – Lehár);
- Pamina (The Magic Flute – Mozart/Schikaneder)
- Gran Sacerdotessa (Aida – Verdi)

In the 2004–2005 season, she performed the following roles:

- Brigitte (Iolanta – Tchaikovsky);
- Bubikopf (The Emperor of Atlantis – Ullmann)
- Kristine (Brata – Alojz Ajdič)

In Salzburg she performed the following roles:

- Susanna (The Marriage of Figaro – Mozart);
- Pamina (The Magic Flute – Mozart);
- Arminda (La finta giardiniera – Mozart);
- Hyazintus (Apollo et Hyacinthus – Mozart)
- Mimi (La bohème – Puccini).Rose Lakme

In the festival Europäische Musikmonat 2001 in Basel, she sang the soprano role in the opera Skamander, by the Swiss composer Beato Gysin. In 2000, Alenka worked with the well known composer György Kurtag for the Swiss radio DRC3.

== Songs ==
- "Cvet z juga" (Flower of the South) (2007)
- "Ženska iz soli" (Woman Made of Salt) (2007)
- "Odidi" (Leave) (2008)
- "Nek Te Voli Kao Ja" (No One Loves You Like I Do) (2008)
- "Mostovi" (Bridges) Ft. Sons (2008)
- "Samo Ti" (Only You) Ft. Oliver Dragojević (2009)

== See also ==
- Slovenia in the Eurovision Song Contest 2007

Awards and achievements
Preceded by Anžej Dežan with "Mr Nobody"	Slovenia in the Eurovision Song Contest; 2007	Succeeded by Rebeka Dremelj with "Vrag naj vzame"
