= Nikolovski =

Nikolovski (Macedonian: Николовски), a Macedonian surname, and may refer to:

- Goce Nikolovski
- Igor Nikolovski, Macedonian footballer
- Jane Nikolovski, Macedonian footballer

in female form it is Nikolovska:

- Rosica Nikolovska
- Ljiljana Nikolovska
