= Top Stripper =

Slovenian hard rock band

- Origin: Ljubljana, Slovenija
- Genres: rock, hard rock
- Years active: 2009–present
- Members: Jaša Šaban; Jure Demšar; Rok Rožmanec
- Past members: Miha Majcen; Aleš Strnad; Rok Pavlin

Top Stripper is a Slovenian rock band, created in Ljubljana, 2009. The group consists of Jaša Šaban (lead singer), Jure Demšar (lead guitar) and Rok Rožmanec (guitar, singer). Their first album Luck Don't Come Cheap was released in 2016. It also includes the most famous single Can't Hear You Cryin.

It began in high school when they started playing rock and blues hits from famous rock bands such as Guns N' Roses and AC/DC. Soon after that, they began writing their own music. As a support act, they have performed concerts to many famous bands such as Triggerfinger, H.I.M., Morcheeba, Letz Zep, Guns2Roses and some others.

First single "Can't Hear You Cryin'" was soon followed by their first album Luck Don't Come Cheap. Their motto is "The Soul of Blues and the Heart of Rock’n’Roll".

== Members ==
- Jaša Šaban – lead singer
- Jure Demšar – lead guitar
- Rok Rožmanec – guitar, singer

== Discography ==
=== Luck Don't Come Cheap ===
1. Can't Hear You Cryin’
2. The City of Angels
3. Shoot the Boy
4. Crazy Child
5. Gone with the Train
6. The Sound of the Devil
7. Why Do I Need the Rain
8. You Can All Go to Hell
9. Do You Think It's Easy
