= Atomik Harmonik =

Slovenian musical group

- Origin: Slovenia
- Genres: Turbo-folk, Eastern European polkatronica, Comedy music
- Years active: 2004–present
- Label: Menart Records
- Members: Jani Pavec (2004–); Mateja Poročnik (2011–); Saška Hren (2011–); Miha Ojsteršek (2011–)
- Past members: Špela "Špelca" Kleinlercher (2004–2006); Iris Soban (2006); Dejan "Frai Toni" Čelik (2004–2009); Tomo Primc (2009–2011); Mateja "Tejči" Vuk (2006–2010); Špela Grošelj (2004–2010); Darja Gajšek (2010); Gašper Krek (2010–2011); Petra Crnjac (2010–2011); Vesna Kociper (2010–2011); Uroš Kržan (2011–2011); Mateja "Matejči" Mohar (2015–2015)
- Website: www.atomikharmonik.si

Atomik Harmonik is a turbo-folk music group from Kamnik, Slovenia. Their debut single "Brizgalna Brizga" stayed at #1 in the Slovenian pop charts for several months. Their "Turbo Polka" hit the charts in Germany and Austria, bringing the group fame across Europe.

== Members ==
- Jani Pavec
- Miha Ojsteršek
- Mateja Poročnik
- Anže Turk
- Maja Ramšak

=== Former members ===
- Mateja "Matejči" Mohar (2015–2015)
- Uroš Kržan (2011–2011)
- Vesna Kociper (2010–2011)
- Petra Crnjac (2010–2011)
- Gašper Krek (2010–2011)
- Darja Gajšek (2010)
- Špela Grošelj (2004–2010)
- Mateja ("Tejči") Vuk (19 September 2006 – 2010)
- Tomo Primc (2009–2011)
- Dejan "Frai Toni" Čelik (2004–2009)
- Iris Soban (10 April 2006 – 24 April 2006)
- Špela ("Špelca") Kleinlercher (2004–2006)

=== Singles ===
- From Brizgaaaaj!:
  - 2004 "Brizgalna Brizga"
  - 2005 "Na seniku"
- From Brizgaaaaj! Še več in dlje!:
  - 2005 "Turbo Polka"
- From Vriskaaaj!:
  - 2006 "Polkaholik"
- From Traktor polka:
  - 2011 "Traktor polka"

== See also ==
- Turbo Angels
