= Zmelkoow =

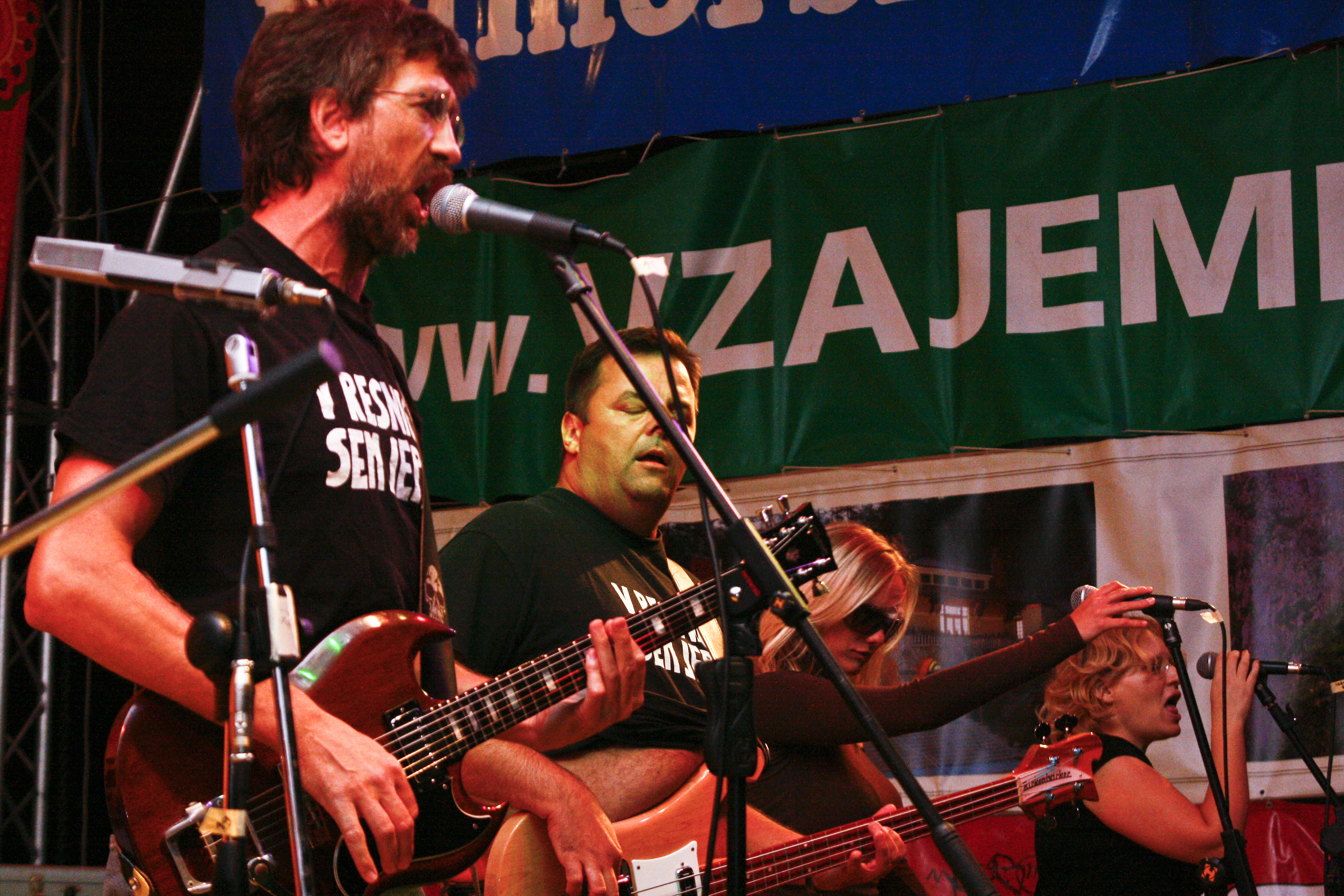
- Zmelkoow in 2008

Background information
- Origin: Koper, Slovenia
- Genres: rock, pop, Comedy rock
- Years active: 1992 – present
- Members: Goga Sedmak (vocals, guitar) Žare Pavletič (bass guitar); Aleš Koščak (drums); Anuša Podgornik (keyboards, flute, vocals) Eva Brajkovič (vocals)
- Website: zmelkoow.net

Zmelkoow is a Slovenian comedy rock band, founded in Koper in 1992. The band's members include Gorazd "Goga" Sedmak (singer and guitarist), Žare Pavletič (bass guitarist), Aleš Koščak (drummer), and Anuša Podgornik (keyboards, flute, vocals). It is known for a distinctive humor in most of their songs' lyrics, spanning from philosophical (song titled "Bit") to ironic. One of their less known CDs contains songs remade in medieval fashion.

== Discography ==
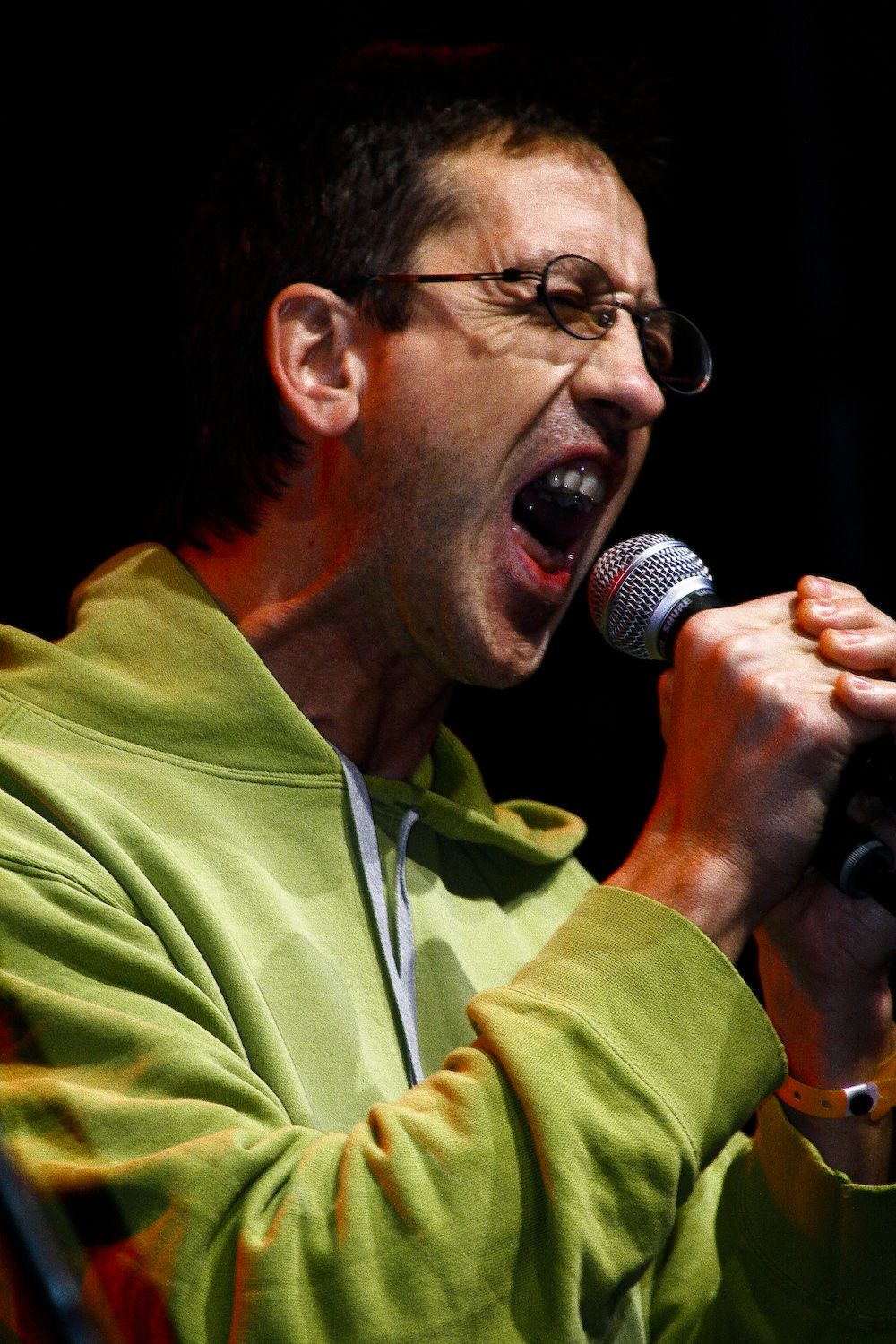
The groups' lead singer and songwriter Gorazd Sedmak

=== Albums ===
- Pionirji Divergentnega Marketinga CD (2016)
- Čista jajca? CD (2009)
- Kolekcija Jesen 93 - Poletje 07 2x CD (2007)
- Zmelkoow plošča CD (2004)
- Superheroji v akciji CD MC (2001)
- Izštekani pri Juretu Longyki CD MC (2000)
- Dej, nosorog, pazi kam stopaš! CD MC (1999)
- Srebrna CD MC (1997)
- Čiko Pajo in Pako CD MC (1996)
- Kdo se je zbral? CD MC (1994)

=== Singles, EP's ===
- Malo Dnarja, Malo Muzike 5 x files EP (2015)
- Kino Šiška EP CD (2011)
- Zdej en dan v srednjem veku CDr (2007)
- Kishta (Moj računalnik je neumna kišta!!)10" EP (1998)
- Klub ljudi z resnimi težavami CD Shape (1997)
- Napačen planet CD3" (1996)
- Yo! 7" (1994)
- Streloowod + Brrr... + Čau sonček 7" (1993)
