= Trkaj =

Slovenian rapper (born 1983)

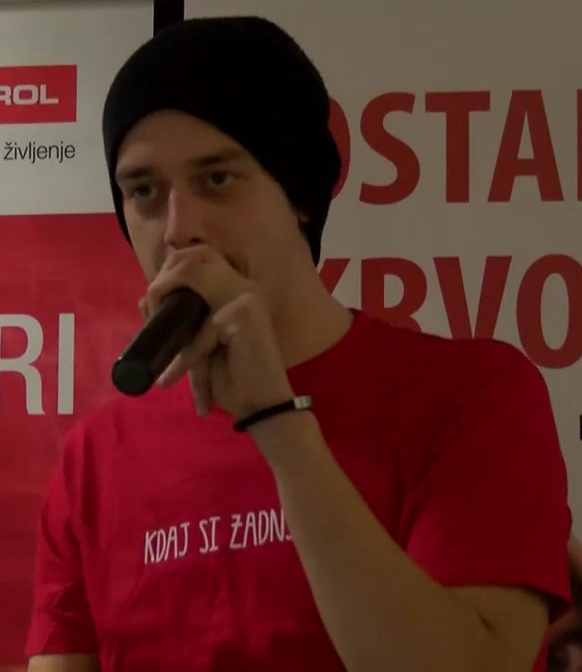
Trkaj in 2013

Rok Terkaj (born 1 March 1983), better known as Trkaj, is a rapper from Slovenia. He has also been active as a social activist and a writer.

== Life ==
Trkaj grew up in the Savsko Naselje neighbourhood in the Bežigrad District of Ljubljana. He started rapping at the age of 17. He joined the freestyle band Rodbine Trgavšek, alongside its members (N'toko, Boštjan Gorenc - Pižama, Valterap, and DJ Supastar), and performed throughout Slovenia, later becoming a member of the Generacija 00 group under the umbrella of the Z Glavo na Zabavo (Party With Your Head) Foundation. His artistic name is a derivative of his surname, as at home, in the Savsko Naselje, he is called Trkaj, without the e. In 2004, he walked 800 km of Camino de Santiago and then studied theology from 2006 until 2011, when he graduated. In 2009, he walked from Ljubljana to Sarajevo and carried out the Kul Vinska Tura (Cool Wine Tour) when he visited Styrian towns and villages by foot, promoting rap and the region. He was bestowed the highest award by the Slovenian Marketing Festival for the tour.

== Music ==
In 2003, Trkaj won the 8 Mile freestyle battle championship and a few months later the 2nd Slovenian Freestyle Championship along with fellow rapper N'toko. His prize was a record deal with RapNika, and he released his debut album V času enga diha in 2004. The album was a commercial success, but it lacked some critical acclaim indicating that Trkaj re-recorded a lot of his songs that were already online as demo songs.

In 2005, he announced a new album to be released on his birthday in March 2006, but the album wasn't released due to complications with the label. It was rescheduled to a year later and finally released in December 2007, called Rapostol (meaning apostle in rap music).

In 2009, he won the Slovenian music award Diamant as the best male music performer for Rapostol.
