= N'toko =

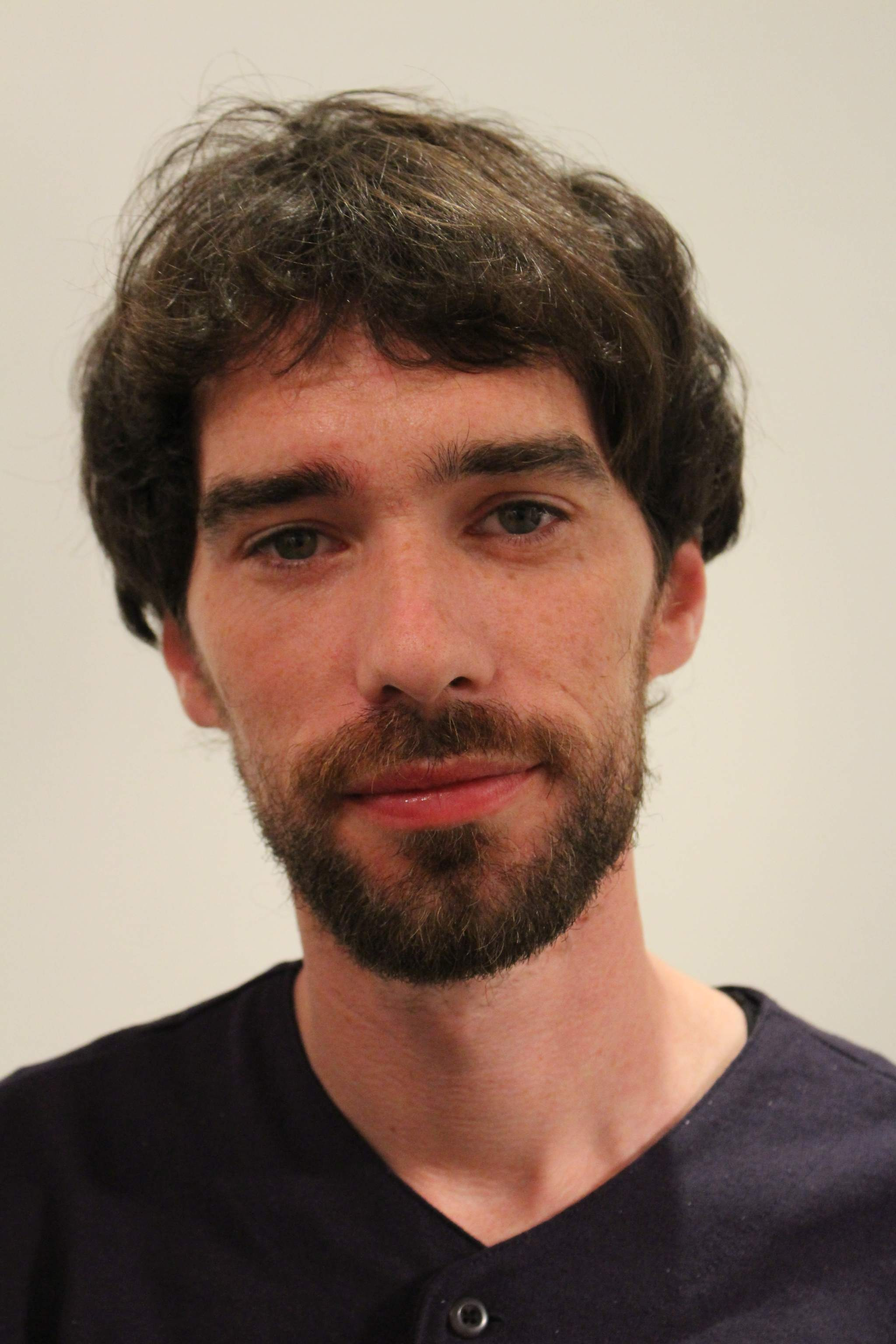
- N'toko in 2015

Background information
- Birth name: Miha Blažič
- Born: 1980 (age 44–45); Novo Mesto, SFR Yugoslavia
- Occupation(s): musician, songwriter, columnist
- Years active: 2000–present
- Website: ntoko.si

Miha Blažič, better known by his stage name N'toko, is a Slovenian rapper and lead vocalist of Moveknowledgement. He is well known for his socially critical lyrics, which gave him acclaim in the underground Slovenian hip-hop scene. He freestyles and writes in English as well.

N'toko is a three-time Slovenian freestyle champion. In years 2001 and 2003, where he came up tied with fellow rapper Trkaj in the finals (this was the only 'battle' he didn't win, neither did he lose). He was also the champion in freestyle battle, 2009.

Shortly after his second title, that was rewarded with a record deal at Nika Records, N'toko released his debut album Cesarjeva nova podoba (Emperor's new image) which is considered as the best rap album on Slovenian scene. Year later Ntoko would record his strictly English EP, Where's Waldo EP, that was again critically acclaimed. His second album was yet again another great album, in 2007, he released his second EP as well.

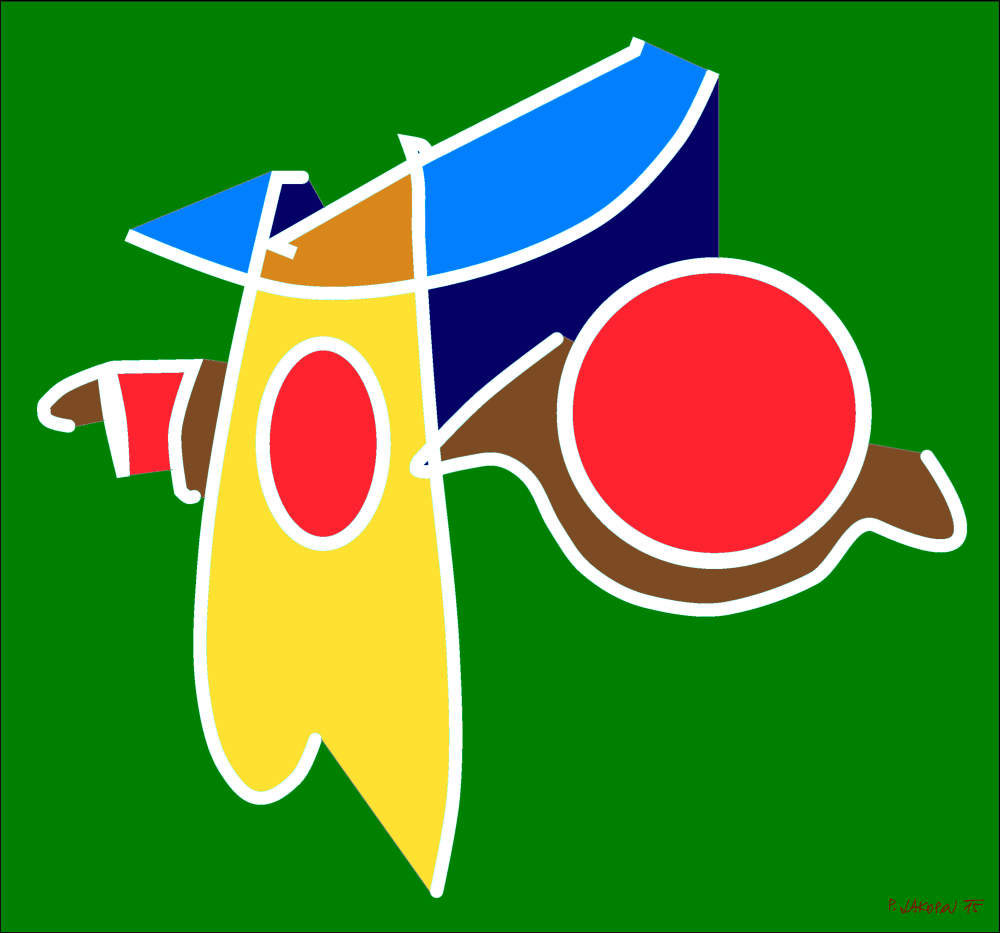
N'Toko Le Toubab by Primož Jakopin, after the rapper's signature and the name's country flag.

He also released three albums with Moveknowledgement.
