= Maraaya discography =

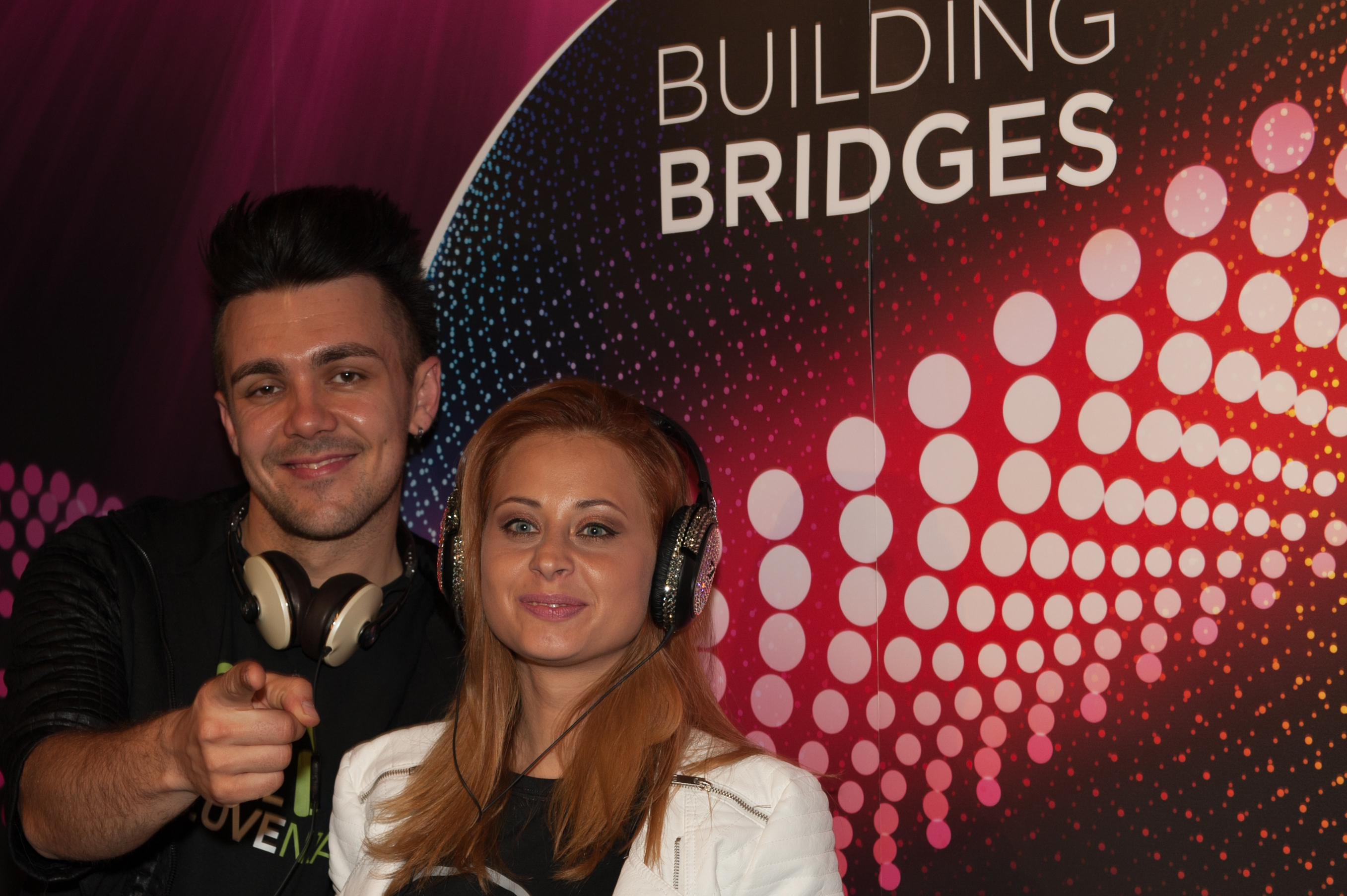
- Maraaya in 2015.
- Singles: 10

The discography of Maraaya, a Slovenian duo, consists of ten singles. They represented Slovenia at the 2015 Eurovision Song Contest in Vienna, Austria, with the song "Here for You", coming fourteenth in the final with 39 points.

== Singles ==
=== As lead artist ===
Title	Year	Peak chart positions							Album
Title	Year	SLO	AUT	SVK	ITA	BEL (Fl-Tip)	SWE (heats.)	FIN (digital)	Album
"Lovin' Me"	2014	13	—	—	52	83	—	—	Non-album singles
"Here for You"	2015	1	23	24	—	48	10	18	Non-album singles
"Living Again"	2015	12	—	—	—	—	—	—	Non-album singles
"Nothing Left for Me"	2016	18	—	—	—	—	—	—	Non-album singles
"It's Complicated" (featuring BQL)	2017	9	—	—	—	—	—	—	Non-album singles
"Sjaj" (featuring BQL)	2017	—	—	—	—	—	—	—	CMC Vodice 2017
"Diamond Duck"	2017	1	—	—	—	—	—	—	Non-album singles
"Mi corazón es tuyo" (Domestikus & Maraaya)	2018	—	—	—	—	—	—	—	CMC Vodice 2018
"Noć (Mi corazón es tuyo)" (Domestikus & Maraaya)	2018	—	—	—	—	—	—	—	Non-album singles
"Besplatno"	2019	—	—	—	—	—	—	—	Non-album singles
"Obujem nove čevlje"	2020	4	—	—	—	—	—	—	Non-album singles
"Drevo"	2020	13	—	—	—	—	—	—	Non-album singles
"Dobr' gre"	2021	1	—	—	—	—	—	—	Non-album singles
"1000 let"	2021	—	—	—	—	—	—	—	
"V Naju še Verjamem" (Jan Plestenjak & Maraaya)	2021	—	—	—	—	—	—	—	
"—" denotes a single that did not chart or was not released.

=== As featured artists ===
Title	Year	Peak chart positions							Album
Title	Year	SLO	AUT	SVK	ITA	BEL (Fl-Tip)	SWE (heats.)	FIN (digital)	Album
"Rain in Your Eyes" (LukeAt featuring Maraaya)	2014	—	—	—	—	—	—	—	Lo Zoo Di (Vol.9)
"—" denotes a single that did not chart or was not released.

== Other charted songs ==
Title	Year	Peak chart positions							Album
Title	Year	SLO	AUT	SVK	ITA	BEL (Fl-Tip)	SWE (heats.)	FIN (digital)	Album
"White Christmas / Bel božič" (Maraaya & BQL & Nika Zorjan & Manca Špik & Luka Basi & Klara Jazbec & Ula)	2017	31	—	—	—	—	—	—	Non-album singles
not released as a single, but did chart in some countries.
