= List of number-one singles of 2016 (Slovenia) =

SloTop50 singles 2016
Winners
- Most weeks at No. 1: "Srce za srce"
- Year End No. 1: Photograph

List of the Slovenian number-one singles of 2016 compiled by SloTop50, is the official chart provider of Slovenia. SloTop50 publishes weekly charts once a week, every Sunday. Chart contain data generated by the SloTop50 system according to any song played during the period starting the previous Monday morning at time 00:00:00 and ending Sunday night at 23:59:59.

== Charts ==
=== Number-one singles by week ===
Weekly charted #1 songs and highest charted counting among domestic songs only

No.	Week	Issue date	Number one	Artist	Top domestic song	Top domestic artist
33	158	10 January 2016	"Hello"	Adele	"Living Again"	Maraaya
34	159	17 January 2016	"Book of Love"	Felix Jaehn featuring Polina	"Living Again"	Maraaya
re	160	24 January 2016	"Hello"	Adele	"Here for You"	Maraaya
re	161	31 January 2016	"Hello"	Adele	"Here for You"	Maraaya
re	162	7 February 2016	"Hello"	Adele	"Here for You"	Maraaya
re	163	14 February 2016	"Hello"	Adele	"Here for You"	Maraaya
re	164	21 February 2016	"Hello"	Adele	"Here for You"	Maraaya
35	165	28 February 2016	"Adventure of a Lifetime"	Coldplay	"Here for You"	Maraaya
35	166	6 March 2016	"Adventure of a Lifetime"	Coldplay	"Here for You"	Maraaya
36	167	13 March 2016	"Stiches"	Shawn Mendes	"Here for You"	Maraaya
36	168	20 March 2016	"Stiches"	Shawn Mendes	"Here for You"	Maraaya
re	169	27 March 2016	"Reality"	Lost Frequencies ft. Janieck Devy	"Here for You"	Maraaya
re	170	3 April 2016	"Stitches"	Shawn Mendes	"Prelepa za poraz"	Jan Plestenjak
37	171	10 April 2016	"Love Yourself"	Justin Bieber	"Prelepa za poraz"	Jan Plestenjak
37	172	17 April 2016	"Love Yourself"	Justin Bieber	"Blue and Red"	ManuElla
37	173	24 April 2016	"Love Yourself"	Justin Bieber	"Blue and Red"	ManuElla
37	174	1 May 2016	"Love Yourself"	Justin Bieber	"Blue and Red"	ManuElla
38	175	8 May 2016	"7 Years"	Lukas Graham	"Blue and Red"	ManuElla
39	176	15 May 2016	"Blue and Red"	ManuElla	"Blue and Red"	ManuElla
40	177	22 May 2016	"Cheap Thrills"	Sia	"To mi je všeč"	Nina Pušlar
40	178	29 May 2016	"Cheap Thrills"	Sia	"To mi je všeč"	Nina Pušlar
41	179	5 June 2016	"Can't Stop the Feeling!"	Justin Timberlake	"To mi je všeč"	Nina Pušlar
41	180	12 June 2016	"Can't Stop the Feeling!"	Justin Timberlake	"To mi je všeč"	Nina Pušlar
41	181	19 June 2016	"Can't Stop the Feeling!"	Justin Timberlake	"To mi je všeč"	Nina Pušlar
41	182	26 June 2016	"Can't Stop the Feeling!"	Justin Timberlake	"To mi je všeč"	Nina Pušlar
41	183	3 July 2016	"Can't Stop the Feeling!"	Justin Timberlake	"To mi je všeč"	Nina Pušlar
41	184	10 July 2016	"Can't Stop the Feeling!"	Justin Timberlake	"To mi je všeč"	Nina Pušlar
42	185	17 July 2016	"Srce za srce"	Alya	"Srce za srce"	Alya
42	186	24 July 2016	"Srce za srce"	Alya	"Srce za srce"	Alya
re	187	31 July 2016	"Can't Stop the Feeling"	Justin Timberlake	"Srce za srce"	Alya
re	188	7 August 2016	"Srce za srce"	Alya	"Srce za srce"	Alya
re	189	14 August 2016	"Srce za srce"	Alya	"Srce za srce"	Alya
re	190	21 August 2016	"Srce za srce"	Alya	"Srce za srce"	Alya
re	191	28 August 2016	"Srce za srce"	Alya	"Srce za srce"	Alya
re	192	4 September 2016	"Srce za srce"	Alya	"Srce za srce"	Alya
re	193	11 September 2016	"Srce za srce"	Alya	"Srce za srce"	Alya
re	194	18 September 2016	"Srce za srce"	Alya	"Srce za srce"	Alya
43	195	25 September 2016	"Muza"	BQL	"Muza"	BQL
44	196	2 October 2016	"Duele el Corazón"	Enrique Iglesias featuring Wisin	"Muza"	BQL
44	197	9 October 2016	"Duele el Corazón"	Enrique Iglesias featuring Wisin	"Muza"	BQL
44	198	16 October 2016	"Duele el Corazón"	Enrique Iglesias featuring Wisin	"Srce za srce"	Alya
45	199	23 October 2016	"Treat You Better"	Shawn Mendes	"Srce za srce"	Alya
46	200	30 October 2016	"Don't Be So Shy"	Imany	"Srce za srce"	Alya
re	201	6 November 2016	"Treat You Better"	Shawn Mendes	"Pesem"	Manca Špik & Kvartopirci
re	202	13 November 2016	"Treat You Better"	Shawn Mendes	"Srce za srce"	Alya
re	203	20 November 2016	"Don't Be So Shy"	Imany	"Vrhovi"	Neisha
47	204	27 November 2016	"The Greatest"	Sia featuring Kendrick Lamar	"Srce za srce"	Alya
48	205	4 December 2016	"Lost on You"	LP	"Srce za srce"	Alya
49	206	11 December 2016	"Human"	Rag'n'Bone Man	"Srce za srce"	Alya
50	207	18 December 2016	"All I Want for Christmas Is You"	Mariah Carey	"Srce za srce"	Alya
51	208	25 December 2016	"Driving Home for Christmas"	Chris Rea	"Milijon in ena"	Klara Jazbec
52	209	1 January 2017	"Love My Life"	Robbie Williams	"Milijon in ena"	Klara Jazbec

=== Number-one singles by month ===
Monthly charted #1 songs and highest charted counting among domestic songs only

No.	Month	Issue date	Number-one	Artist	Top domestic song	Top domestic artist
re	37	January 2016	"Hello"	Adele	"Living Again"	Maraaya
re	38	February 2016	"Hello"	Adele	"Here for You"	Maraaya
22	39	March 2016	"Stitches"	Shawn Mendes	"Here for You"	Maraaya
23	40	April 2016	"Love Yourself"	Justin Bieber	"Blue and Red"	ManuElla
24	41	May 2016	"Cheap Thrills"	Sia	"Blue and Red"	ManuElla
25	42	June 2016	"Can't Stop the Feeling"	Justin Timberlake	"To mi je všeč"	Nina Pušlar
25	43	July 2016	"Can't Stop the Feeling"	Justin Timberlake	"To mi je všeč"	Nina Pušlar
26	44	August 2016	"Srce za srce"	Alya	"Srce za srce"	Alya
26	45	September 2016	"Srce za srce"	Alya	"Srce za srce"	Alya
27	46	October 2016	"Treat You Better"	Mendes Shawn	"Srce za srce"	Alya
28	47	November 2016	"Don't Be So Shy"	Imany	"Srce za srce"	Alya
29	48	December 2016	"Lost on You"	LP	"Srce za srce"	Alya
