= List of number-one singles of 2020 (Slovenia) =

SloTop50 singles 2020
Winners
- Most weeks at No. 1: "Blinding Lights"
- Year End No. 1: "Blinding Lights"

List of the Slovenian number-one singles of 2020 compiled by SloTop50, is the official chart provider of Slovenia. SloTop50 publishes weekly charts once a week, every Sunday. Chart contain data generated by the SloTop50 system according to any song played during the period starting the previous Monday morning at time 00:00:00 and ending Sunday night at 23:59:59.

== Charts ==
=== Number-one singles by week ===
Weekly charted #1 songs and highest charted counting among domestic songs only

†	Indicates best-performing single of 2020

No.	Week	Issue date	Number one	Artist	Top domestic song	Top domestic artist
79	366	5 January 2020	"Dance Monkey"	Tones and I	"Beli oblaki, bele snežinke"	Poskočni muzikanti & Nuša Derenda
79	367	12 January 2020	"Dance Monkey"	Tones and I	"Svet na dlani"	Nina Pušlar
79	368	19 January 2020	"Dance Monkey"	Tones and I	"Svet na dlani"	Nina Pušlar
79	369	26 January 2020	"Dance Monkey"	Tones and I	"Svet na dlani"	Nina Pušlar
80	370	2 February 2020	"Memories"	Maroon 5	"Svet na dlani"	Nina Pušlar
80	371	9 February 2020	"Memories"	Maroon 5	"Svet na dlani"	Nina Pušlar
80	372	16 February 2020	"Memories"	Maroon 5	"Svet na dlani"	Nina Pušlar
80	373	23 February 2020	"Memories"	Maroon 5	"Svet na dlani"	Nina Pušlar
80	374	1 March 2020	"Don't Start Now"	Dua Lipa	"Srce za srce"	Alya
81	375	8 March 2020	"Don't Start Now"	Dua Lipa	"Včeraj in za zmeraj"	Nina Pušlar
re	376	15 March 2020	"Memories"	Maroon 5	"Svet na dlani"	Nina Pušlar
82	377	22 March 2020	"Blinding Lights"	The Weeknd	"Sreča"	Pop Design
82	378	29 March 2020	"Blinding Lights"	The Weeknd	"Sreča"	Pop Design
82	379	5 April 2020	"Blinding Lights"	The Weeknd	"Človek brez imena"	Jan Plestenjak
82	380	12 April 2020	"Blinding Lights"	The Weeknd	"Nocoj"	Manca Špik
82	381	19 April 2020	"Blinding Lights"	The Weeknd	"Nocoj"	Manca Špik
82	382	26 April 2020	"Blinding Lights"	The Weeknd	"Nocoj"	Manca Špik
82	383	3 May 2020	"Blinding Lights"	The Weeknd	"Malo, malo"	Rebeka Dremelj
82	384	10 May 2020	"Blinding Lights"	The Weeknd	"Malo, malo"	Rebeka Dremelj
82	385	17 May 2020	"Blinding Lights"	The Weeknd	"Na frišno"	BQL
82	386	24 May 2020	"Blinding Lights"	The Weeknd	"Še zdaj ne vem zakaj"	Vili Resnik
82	387	31 May 2020	"Blinding Lights"	The Weeknd	"Na frišno"	BQL
82	388	7 June 2020	"Blinding Lights"	The Weeknd	"Še zdaj ne vem zakaj"	Vili Resnik
82	389	14 June 2020	"Blinding Lights"	The Weeknd	"Na frišno"	BQL
82	390	21 June 2020	"Blinding Lights"	The Weeknd	"Na frišno"	BQL
82	391	28 June 2020	"Blinding Lights"	The Weeknd	"Nimam skrbi"	Sopranos
83	392	5 July 2020	"Breaking Me"	Topic ft A7S	"Mojito"	Lara Kadis
83	393	12 July 2020	"Breaking Me"	Topic ft A7S	"Mojito"	Lara Kadis
83	394	19 July 2020	"Breaking Me"	Topic ft A7S	"Mojito"	Lara Kadis
83	395	26 July 2020	"Breaking Me"	Topic ft A7S	"Mojito"	Lara Kadis
83	396	2 August 2020	"Breaking Me"	Topic ft A7S	"Mojito"	Lara Kadis
83	397	9 August 2020	"Breaking Me"	Topic ft A7S	"Mojito"	Lara Kadis
84	398	16 August 2020	"Rain on Me"	Lady Gaga and Ariana Grande	"Ko bo to za nama" "Mojito"	BQL; Lara Kadis
84	399	23 August 2020	"Rain on Me"	Lady Gaga and Ariana Grande	"Mojito"	Lara Kadis
84	400	30 August 2020	"Rain on Me"	Lady Gaga and Ariana Grande	"Mojito"	Lara Kadis
85	401	6 September 2020	"Savage Love (Laxed – Siren Beat)"	Jawsh 685 and Jason Derulo	"Ko bo to za nama"	BQL
85	402	13 September 2020	"Savage Love (Laxed – Siren Beat)"	Jawsh 685 and Jason Derulo	"Obujem nove čevlje"	Maraaya
85	403	20 September 2020	"Savage Love (Laxed – Siren Beat)"	Jawsh 685 and Jason Derulo	"Obujem nove čevlje"	Maraaya
85	404	27 September 2020	"Savage Love (Laxed – Siren Beat)"	Jawsh 685 and Jason Derulo	"Obujem nove čevlje"	Maraaya
85	405	4 October 2020	"Savage Love (Laxed – Siren Beat)"	Jawsh 685 and Jason Derulo	"Obujem nove čevlje"	Maraaya
85	406	11 October 2020	"Savage Love (Laxed – Siren Beat)"	Jawsh 685 and Jason Derulo	"Obujem nove čevlje"	Maraaya
85	407	18 October 2020	"Savage Love (Laxed – Siren Beat)"	Jawsh 685 and Jason Derulo	"Obujem nove čevlje"	Maraaya
86	408	25 October 2020	"Watermelon Sugar"	Harry Styles	"Obujem nove čevlje"	Maraaya
86	409	1 November 2020	"Watermelon Sugar"	Harry Styles	"Obujem nove čevlje"	Maraaya
86	410	8 November 2020	"Watermelon Sugar"	Harry Styles	"Obujem nove čevlje"	Maraaya
re	411	15 November 2020	"Savage Love (Laxed – Siren Beat)"	Jawsh 685 and Jason Derulo	"Julija"	Boom!
87	412	22 November 2020	"Kings & Queens"	Ava Max	"Drevo"	Maraaya
87	413	29 November 2020	"Kings & Queens"	Ava Max	"Drevo"	Maraaya
88	414	6 December 2020	"Head & Heart"	Joel Corry & MNEK	"Drevo"	Maraaya
88	415	13 December 2020	"Head & Heart"	Joel Corry & MNEK	"Meni dobro je"	Jan Plestenjak
89	416	20 December 2020	"Meni dobro je"	Jan Plestenjak	"Meni dobro je"	Jan Plestenjak
re	417	27 December 2020	"Last Christmas"	Wham!	"Meni dobro je"	Jan Plestenjak
re	418	3 January 2021	"Head & Heart"	Joel Corry & MNEK	"Meni dobro je"	Jan Plestenjak
