= List of number-one singles of 2013 (Slovenia) =

SloTop50 singles 2013
Winners
- Most weeks at No. 1: "People Help the People"
- Year-end No. 1: "Wake Me Up"

List of the Slovenian number-one singles of 2013 compiled by SloTop50, is the official chart provider of Slovenia. SloTop50 publishes weekly charts once a week, every Sunday. Chart contain data generated by the SloTop50 system according to any song played during the period starting the previous Monday morning at time 00:00:00 and ending Sunday night at 23:59:59.

== Charts ==
=== Number-one singles by week ===
Weekly charted #1 songs and highest charted counting among domestic songs only

†	Indicates best-performing single of 2013

No.	Week	Issue date	Number one	Artist	Top domestic song	Top domestic artist
1	1	6 January 2013	"Srečno novo leto"	Rok'n'Band	"Srečno novo leto"	Rok'n'Band
2	2	13 January 2013	"Krila"	Neisha	"Krila"	Neisha
3	3	20 January 2013	"Stronger (What Doesn't Kill You)"	Kelly Clarkson	"I'd Like To (My FB Song)"	April
re	4	27 January 2013	"Krila"	Neisha	"Krila"	Neisha
re	5	3 February 2013	"Stronger (What Doesn't Kill You)"	Kelly Clarkson	"I'd Like To (My FB Song)"	April
4	6	10 February 2013	"To je moj dan"	Kataya	"To je moj dan"	Kataya
5	7	17 February 2013	"People Help the People"	Birdy	"I'd Like To (My FB Song)"	April
5	8	24 February 2013	"People Help the People"	Birdy	"Dan brez tebe"	Victory
5	9	3 March 2013	"People Help the People"	Birdy	"Dan brez tebe"	Victory
5	10	10 March 2013	"People Help the People"	Birdy	"Poljubljena"	Tabu
5	11	17 March 2013	"People Help the People"	Birdy	"To je moj dan"	Kataya
5	12	24 March 2013	"People Help the People"	Birdy	"Čas"	Dan D
5	13	31 March 2013	"People Help the People"	Birdy	"To je moj dan"	Kataya
5	14	7 April 2013	"People Help the People"	Birdy	"Dan brez tebe"	Victory
5	15	14 April 2013	"People Help the People"	Birdy	"Dan brez tebe"	Victory
5	16	21 April 2013	"People Help the People"	Birdy	"Dan brez tebe"	Victory
5	17	28 April 2013	"People Help the People"	Birdy	"Dan brez tebe"	Victory
5	18	5 May 2013	"People Help the People"	Birdy	"Zbudi se za prvi maj"	Mi2
5	19	12 May 2013	"People Help the People"	Birdy	"Poljubljena"	Tabu
5	20	19 May 2013	"People Help the People"	Birdy	"To je moj dan"	Kataya
6	21	26 May 2013	"Hollywood Hills"	Sunrise Avenue	"Dan ljubezni"	Pepel in kri
7	22	2 June 2013	"Hvala za vijolice"	Bilbi	"Hvala za vijolice"	Bilbi
re	23	9 June 2013	"Stronger (What Doesn't Kill You)"	Kelly Clarkson	"Hvala za vijolice"	Bilbi
re	24	16 June 2013	"Hvala za vijolice"	Bilbi	"Hvala za vijolice"	Bilbi
8	25	23 June 2013	"Pumped Up Kicks"	Foster the People	"Poljubljena"	Tabu
8	26	30 June 2013	"Pumped Up Kicks"	Foster the People	"Hvala za vijolice"	Bilbi
8	27	7 July 2013	"Pumped Up Kicks"	Foster the People	"I'd Like To (My FB Song)"	April
9	28	14 July 2013	"Get Lucky"	Daft Punk feat. Pharrell Williams	"Mars in Venera"	Tinkara Kovač
9	29	21 July 2013	"Get Lucky"	Daft Punk feat. Pharrell Williams	"Nasmeh življenja"	Nika Zorjan
9	30	28 July 2013	"Get Lucky"	Daft Punk feat. Pharrell Williams	"Nasmeh življenja"	Nika Zorjan
9	31	4 August 2013	"Get Lucky"	Daft Punk feat. Pharrell Williams	"Nasmeh življenja"	Nika Zorjan
10	32	11 August 2013	"Wake Me Up" †	Avicii feat. Aloe Blacc	"Nasmeh življenja"	Nika Zorjan
10	33	18 August 2013	"Wake Me Up" †	Avicii feat. Aloe Blacc	"Nasmeh življenja"	Nika Zorjan
10	34	25 August 2013	"Wake Me Up" †	Avicii feat. Aloe Blacc	"Nasmeh življenja"	Nika Zorjan
10	35	1 September 2013	"Wake Me Up" †	Avicii feat. Aloe Blacc	"Nasmeh življenja"	Nika Zorjan
10	36	8 September 2013	"Wake Me Up" †	Avicii feat. Aloe Blacc	"Nasmeh življenja"	Nika Zorjan
10	37	15 September 2013	"Wake Me Up" †	Avicii feat. Aloe Blacc	"Nasmeh življenja"	Nika Zorjan
10	38	22 September 2013	"Wake Me Up" †	Avicii feat. Aloe Blacc	"Čao lepa"	Jan Plestenjak
10	39	29 September 2013	"Wake Me Up" †	Avicii feat. Aloe Blacc	"Nasmeh življenja"	Nika Zorjan
10	40	6 October 2013	"Wake Me Up" †	Avicii feat. Aloe Blacc	"Svet je tvoj!"	Nina Pušlar
10	41	13 October 2013	"Wake Me Up" †	Avicii feat. Aloe Blacc	"Nasmeh življenja"	Nika Zorjan
10	42	20 October 2013	"Wake Me Up" †	Avicii feat. Aloe Blacc	"Nasmeh življenja"	Nika Zorjan
11	43	27 October 2013	"Roar"	Katy Perry	"Zaljubljena"	Victory
11	44	3 November 2013	"Roar"	Katy Perry	"Nasmeh življenja"	Nika Zorjan
12	45	10 November 2013	"Bonfire Heart"	James Blunt	"Nasmeh življenja"	Nika Zorjan
12	46	17 November 2013	"Bonfire Heart"	James Blunt	"Nov dan"	Muff
12	47	24 November 2013	"Bonfire Heart"	James Blunt	"Nov dan"	Muff
12	48	1 December 2013	"Bonfire Heart"	James Blunt	"Nov dan"	Muff
12	49	8 December 2013	"Bonfire Heart"	James Blunt	"Nov dan"	Muff
13	50	15 December 2013	"Hey Brother"	Avicii	"Nov dan"	Muff
13	51	22 December 2013	"Hey Brother"	Avicii	"Nov dan"	Muff
13	52	29 December 2013	"Hey Brother"	Avicii	"Srečno novo leto"	Rok'n'Band

=== Number-one singles by month ===
Monthly charted #1 songs and highest charted counting among domestic songs only

No.	Month	Issue date	Number-one	Artist	Top domestic song	Top domestic artist
1	1	January 2013	"Stronger"	Kelly Clarkson	"I'd Like To (My FB Song)"	April
2	2	February 2013	"People Help the People"	Birdy	"To je moj dan"	Kataya
2	3	March 2013	"People Help the People"	Birdy	"To je moj dan"	Kataya
2	4	April 2013	"People Help the People"	Birdy	"Dan brez tebe"	Victory
2	5	May 2013	"People Help the People"	Birdy	"To je moj dan"	Kataya
3	6	June 2013	"Pumped Up Kicks"	Foster the People	"I'd Like To (My FB Song)"	April
4	7	July 2013	"Get Lucky"	Daft Punk feat. Pharrell Williams	"Nasmeh življenja"	Nika Zorjan
5	8	August 2013	"Wake Me Up"	Avicii feat. Aloe Blacc	"Nasmeh življenja"	Nika Zorjan
5	9	September 2013	"Wake Me Up"	Avicii feat. Aloe Blacc	"Nasmeh življenja"	Nika Zorjan
5	10	October 2013	"Wake Me Up"	Avicii feat. Aloe Blacc	"Nasmeh življenja"	Nika Zorjan
6	11	November 2013	"Bonfire Heart"	James Blunt	"Nov dan"	Muff
7	12	December 2013	"Hey Brother"	Avicii	"Nov dan"	Muff

=== Number-one singles by year-end ===
The most played singles on 61 different Slovenian radio stations for year 2013.

Rank	Peak chart	Song	Artist
1	1	"Wake Me Up"	Avicii feat. Aloe Blacc
2	1	"Get Lucky"	Daft Punk feat. Pharrell Williams
3	2	"Blurred Lines"	Robin Thicke
4	1	"Roar"	Katy Perry
5	4	"Counting Stars"	OneRepublic
6	4	"Let Her Go"	Passenger
7	3	"Love Me Again"	John Newman
8	1	"Pumped Up Kicks"	Foster the People
9	4	"Just Give Me a Reason"	Pink feat. Nate Ruess
10	1	"Bonfire Heart"	James Blunt
11	4	"Nasmeh življenja"	Nika Zorjan
12	5	"True Love"	Pink
13	6	"La La La"	Naughty Boy feat. Sam Smith
14	1	"People Help the People"	Birdy
15	1	"Hollywood Hills"	Sunrise Avenue
16	1	"To je moj dan"	Kataya
17	2	"Rolling In The Deep"	Adele
18	5	"Mirrors"	Justin Timberlake
19	4	"New Age"	Marlon Roudette
20	4	"Čas"	Dan D
