= List of number-one singles of 2014 (Slovenia) =

SloTop50 singles 2014
Winners
- Most weeks at No. 1: "Budapest"
- Year End No. 1: "Jubel"

List of the Slovenian number-one singles of 2014 compiled by SloTop50, is the official chart provider of Slovenia. SloTop50 publishes weekly charts once a week, every Sunday. Chart contain data generated by the SloTop50 system according to any song played during the period starting the previous Monday morning at time 00:00:00 and ending Sunday night at 23:59:59.

== Charts ==
=== Number-one singles by week ===
Weekly charted #1 songs and highest charted counting among domestic songs only

| No. | Week | Issue date | Number one | Artist | Top domestic song | Top domestic artist |
|---|---|---|---|---|---|---|
| re | 53 | 5 January 2014 | "Wake Me Up" | Avicii feat. Aloe Blacc | "Srečno novo leto" | Rok'n'Band |
| 14 | 54 | 12 January 2014 | "Timber" | Pitbull feat. Kesha | "Nov dan" | Muff |
| 14 | 55 | 19 January 2014 | "Timber" | Pitbull feat. Kesha | "Nov dan" | Muff |
| 14 | 56 | 26 January 2014 | "Timber" | Pitbull feat. Kesha | "Nov dan" | Muff |
| 14 | 57 | 2 February 2014 | "Timber" | Pitbull feat. Kesha | "Nov dan" | Muff |
| 14 | 58 | 9 February 2014 | "Timber" | Pitbull feat. Kesha | "Nov dan" | Muff |
| 14 | 59 | 16 February 2014 | "Timber" | Pitbull feat. Kesha | "Pozitivne misli" | Dan D |
| 14 | 60 | 23 February 2014 | "Timber" | Pitbull feat. Kesha | "Pozitivne misli" | Dan D |
| 14 | 61 | 2 March 2014 | "Timber" | Pitbull feat. Kesha | "Pozitivne misli" | Dan D |
| 15 | 62 | 9 March 2014 | "Stolen Dance" | Milky Chance | "Pozitivne misli" | Dan D |
| 16 | 63 | 16 March 2014 | "Spet" | Tinkara Kovač | "Spet" | Tinkara Kovač |
| 16 | 64 | 23 March 2014 | "Spet" | Tinkara Kovač | "Spet" | Tinkara Kovač |
| re | 65 | 30 March 2014 | "Stolen Dance" | Milky Chance | "Spet" | Tinkara Kovač |
| 17 | 66 | 6 April 2014 | "Happy" | Pharrell Williams | "Spet" | Tinkara Kovač |
| 18 | 67 | 13 April 2014 | "Addicted to You" | Avicii | "Spet" | Tinkara Kovač |
| re | 68 | 20 April 2014 | "Happy" | Pharrell Williams | "Spet" | Tinkara Kovač |
| re | 69 | 27 April 2014 | "Addicted To You" | Avicii | "Spet" | Tinkara Kovač |
| re | 70 | 4 May 2014 | "Happy" | Pharrell Williams | "Spet" | Tinkara Kovač |
| re | 71 | 11 May 2014 | "Spet" | Tinkara Kovač | "Spet" | Tinkara Kovač |
| 19 | 72 | 18 May 2014 | "Waves" | Mr. Probz | "Spet" | Tinkara Kovač |
| 20 | 73 | 25 May 2014 | "Budapest" | George Ezra | "Spet" | Tinkara Kovač |
| 20 | 74 | 1 June 2014 | "Budapest" | George Ezra | "Spet" | Tinkara Kovač |
| 20 | 75 | 8 June 2014 | "Budapest" | George Ezra | "Spet" | Tinkara Kovač |
| 20 | 76 | 15 June 2014 | "Budapest" | George Ezra | "Spet" | Tinkara Kovač |
| 20 | 77 | 22 June 2014 | "Budapest" | George Ezra | "Spet" | Tinkara Kovač |
| 20 | 78 | 29 June 2014 | "Budapest" | George Ezra | "Spet" | Tinkara Kovač |
| re 21 | 79 | 6 July 2014 | "Budapest" "Summer" | George Ezra; Calvin Harris | "Spet" | Tinkara Kovač |
| re | 80 | 13 July 2014 | "Summer" | Calvin Harris | "Spet" | Tinkara Kovač |
| re | 81 | 20 July 2014 | "Summer" | Calvin Harris | "Spet" | Tinkara Kovač |
| re | 82 | 27 July 2014 | "Summer" | Calvin Harris | "Spet" | Tinkara Kovač |
| re | 83 | 3 August 2014 | "Budapest" | George Ezra | "Spet" | Tinkara Kovač |
| re | 84 | 10 August 2014 | "Budapest" | George Ezra | "Spet" | Tinkara Kovač |
| re | 85 | 17 August 2014 | "Budapest" | George Ezra | "Spet" | Tinkara Kovač |
| re | 86 | 24 August 2014 | "Budapest" | George Ezra | "Spet" | Tinkara Kovač |
| re | 87 | 31 August 2014 | "Budapest" | George Ezra | "Spet" | Tinkara Kovač |
| 22 | 88 | 7 September 2014 | "Prayer in C" | Lilly Wood and the Prick & Robin Schulz | "Po dežju" | Nika Zorjan |
| 22 | 89 | 14 September 2014 | "Prayer in C" | Lilly Wood and the Prick & Robin Schulz | "Po dežju" | Nika Zorjan |
| 22 | 90 | 21 September 2014 | "Prayer in C" | Lilly Wood and the Prick & Robin Schulz | "Lovin' Me" | Maraaya |
| 22 | 91 | 28 September 2014 | "Prayer in C" | Lilly Wood and the Prick & Robin Schulz | "Po dežju" | Nika Zorjan |
| 23 | 92 | 5 October 2014 | "Rude" | Magic! | "Po dežju" | Nika Zorjan |
| re | 93 | 12 October 2014 | "Prayer In C" | Lilly Wood and the Prick & Robin Schulz | "Po dežju" | Nika Zorjan |
| re | 94 | 19 October 2014 | "Prayer In C" | Lilly Wood and the Prick & Robin Schulz | "Lovin' Me" | Maraaya |
| re | 95 | 26 October 2014 | "Prayer In C" | Lilly Wood and the Prick & Robin Schulz | "Lovin' Me" | Maraaya |
| 24 | 96 | 2 November 2014 | "All of Me" | John Legend | "Po dežju" | Nika Zorjan |
| re | 97 | 9 November 2014 | "Prayer In C" | Lilly Wood and the Prick & Robin Schulz | "Lovin' Me" | Maraaya |
| 25 | 98 | 16 November 2014 | "All About That Bass" | Meghan Trainor | "Lovin' Me" | Maraaya |
| 25 | 99 | 23 November 2014 | "All About That Bass" | Meghan Trainor | "Lovin' Me" | Maraaya |
| 25 | 100 | 30 November 2014 | "All About That Bass" | Meghan Trainor | "Lovin' Me" | Maraaya |
| 25 | 101 | 7 December 2014 | "All About That Bass" | Meghan Trainor | "Lovin' Me" | Maraaya |
| 25 | 102 | 14 December 2014 | "All About That Bass" | Meghan Trainor | "Lovin' Me" | Maraaya |
| 25 | 103 | 21 December 2014 | "All About That Bass" | Meghan Trainor | "Lovin' Me" | Maraaya |
| 25 | 104 | 28 December 2014 | "All About That Bass" | Meghan Trainor | "Lovin' Me" | Maraaya |

=== Number-one singles by month ===
Monthly charted #1 songs and highest charted counting among domestic songs only

| No. | Month | Issue date | Number-one | Artist | Top domestic song | Top domestic artist |
|---|---|---|---|---|---|---|
| 8 | 13 | January 2014 | "Timber" | Pitbull feat. Kesha | "Nov dan" | Muff |
| 8 | 14 | February 2014 | "Timber" | Pitbull feat. Kesha | "Nov dan" | Muff |
| 9 | 15 | March 2014 | "Stolen Dance" | Milky Chance | "Spet" | Tinkara Kovač |
| 10 | 16 | April 2014 | "Happy" | Pharrell Williams | "Spet" | Tinkara Kovač |
| 11 | 17 | May 2014 | "Spet" | Tinkara Kovač | "Spet" | Tinkara Kovač |
| 12 | 18 | June 2014 | "Budapest" | George Ezra | "Spet" | Tinkara Kovač |
| 13 | 19 | July 2014 | "Summer" | Calvin Harris | "Spet" | Tinkara Kovač |
| re | 20 | August 2014 | "Budapest" | George Ezra | "Spet" | Tinkara Kovač |
| 14 | 21 | September 2014 | "Prayer in C" | Lilly Wood and the Prick & Robin Schulz | "Po dežju" | Nika Zorjan |
| 14 | 22 | October 2014 | "Prayer in C" | Lilly Wood and the Prick & Robin Schulz | "Po dežju" | Nika Zorjan |
| 15 | 23 | November 2014 | "All About That Bass" | Meghan Trainor | "Lovin' Me" | Maraaya |
| 15 | 24 | December 2014 | "All About That Bass" | Meghan Trainor | "Lovin' Me" | Maraaya |
