= List of number-one singles of 2015 (Slovenia) =

SloTop50 singles 2015
Winners
- Most weeks at No. 1: "Cheerleader"
- Year End No. 1: "Love Me Like You Do"

List of the Slovenian number-one singles of 2015 compiled by SloTop50, is the official chart provider of Slovenia. SloTop50 publishes weekly charts once a week, every Sunday. Chart contain data generated by the SloTop50 system according to any song played during the period starting the previous Monday morning at time 00:00:00 and ending Sunday night at 23:59:59.

== Charts ==
=== Number-one singles by week ===
Weekly charted #1 songs and highest charted counting among domestic songs only

†	Indicates best-performing single of 2015

No.	Week	Issue date	Number one	Artist	Top domestic song	Top domestic artist
25	105	4 January 2015	"All About That Bass"	Meghan Trainor	"Lovin' Me"	Maraaya
25	106	11 January 2015	"All About That Bass"	Meghan Trainor	"Lovin' Me"	Maraaya
25	107	18 January 2015	"All About That Bass"	Meghan Trainor	"Lovin' Me"	Maraaya
25	108	25 January 2015	"All About That Bass"	Meghan Trainor	"Lovin' Me"	Maraaya
25	109	1 February 2015	"All About That Bass"	Meghan Trainor	"Lovin' Me"	Maraaya
25	110	8 February 2015	"All About That Bass"	Meghan Trainor	"Lovin' Me"	Maraaya
25	111	15 February 2015	"All About That Bass"	Meghan Trainor	"Lovin' Me"	Maraaya
25	112	22 February 2015	"All About That Bass"	Meghan Trainor	"Lovin' Me"	Maraaya
25	113	1 March 2015	"All About That Bass"	Meghan Trainor	"Lovin' Me"	Maraaya
26	114	8 March 2015	"Love Me Like You Do" †	Ellie Goulding	"Here for You"	Maraaya
26	115	15 March 2015	"Love Me Like You Do" †	Ellie Goulding	"Here for You"	Maraaya
26	116	22 March 2015	"Love Me Like You Do" †	Ellie Goulding	"Here for You"	Maraaya
26	117	29 March 2015	"Love Me Like You Do" †	Ellie Goulding	"Here for You"	Maraaya
26	118	5 April 2015	"Love Me Like You Do" †	Ellie Goulding	"Here for You"	Maraaya
27	119	12 April 2015	"Here for You"	Maraaya	"Here for You"	Maraaya
27	120	19 April 2015	"Here for You"	Maraaya	"Here for You"	Maraaya
27	121	26 April 2015	"Here for You"	Maraaya	"Here for You"	Maraaya
re	122	3 May 2015	"Love Me Like You Do" †	Ellie Goulding	"Here for You"	Maraaya
re	123	10 May 2015	"Here for You"	Maraaya	"Here for You"	Maraaya
re	124	17 May 2015	"Here for You"	Maraaya	"Here for You"	Maraaya
re	125	24 May 2015	"Here for You"	Maraaya	"Here for You"	Maraaya
re	126	31 May 2015	"Here for You"	Maraaya	"Here for You"	Maraaya
28	127	7 June 2015	"Cheerleader"	OMI	"Here for You"	Maraaya
28	128	14 June 2015	"Cheerleader"	OMI	"Here for You"	Maraaya
28	129	21 June 2015	"Cheerleader"	OMI	"Here for You"	Maraaya
28	130	28 June 2015	"Cheerleader"	OMI	"Here for You"	Maraaya
28	131	5 July 2015	"Cheerleader"	OMI	"Here for You"	Maraaya
28	132	12 July 2015	"Cheerleader"	OMI	"Nekaj med nama"	Iztok Easy Novak
28	133	19 July 2015	"Cheerleader"	OMI	"Nekaj med nama"	Iztok Easy Novak
28	134	26 July 2015	"Cheerleader"	OMI	"Carica"	Tanja Žagar
28	135	2 August 2015	"Cheerleader"	OMI	"Nekaj med nama"	Iztok Easy Novak
28	136	9 August 2015	"Cheerleader"	OMI	"Here for You"	Maraaya
28	137	16 August 2015	"Cheerleader"	OMI	"Nekaj med nama"	Iztok Easy Novak
28	138	23 August 2015	"Cheerleader"	OMI	"Carica"	Tanja Žagar
28	139	30 August 2015	"Cheerleader"	OMI	"Piknik"	Siddharta
28	140	6 September 2015	"Cheerleader"	OMI	"Here for You"	Maraaya
29	141	13 September 2015	"Ain't Nobody (Loves Me Better)"	Felix Jaehn feat. Jasmine Thompson	"Here for You"	Maraaya
30	142	20 September 2015	"Sugar"	Robin Schulz feat. Francesco Yates	"Here for You"	Maraaya
31	143	27 September 2015	"Photograph"	Ed Sheeran	"Here for You"	Maraaya
32	144	4 October 2015	"Reality"	Lost Frequencies feat. Janieck Devy	"Ledena"	Siddharta
re	145	11 October 2015	"Sugar"	Robin Schulz feat. Francesco Yates	"Here for You"	Maraaya
re	146	18 October 2015	"Photograph"	Ed Sheeran	"Living Again"	Maraaya
re	147	25 October 2015	"Reality"	Lost Frequencies feat. Janieck Devy	"Living Again"	Maraaya
re	148	1 November 2015	"Reality"	Lost Frequencies feat. Janieck Devy	"Najljubša napaka"	Anja Rupel
33	149	8 November 2015	"Hello"	Adele	"Najljubša napaka"	Anja Rupel
33	150	15 November 2015	"Hello"	Adele	"Stara dobra"	Jan Plestenjak
33	151	22 November 2015	"Hello"	Adele	"Stara dobra"	Jan Plestenjak
33	152	29 November 2015	"Hello"	Adele	"Stara dobra"	Jan Plestenjak
33	153	6 December 2015	"Hello"	Adele	"Stara dobra"	Jan Plestenjak
33	154	13 December 2015	"Hello"	Adele	"Stara dobra"	Jan Plestenjak
33	155	20 December 2015	"Hello"	Adele	"Stara dobra"	Jan Plestenjak
33	156	27 December 2015	"Hello"	Adele	"Living Again"	Maraaya
33	157	3 January 2016	"Hello"	Adele	"Srečno novo leto"	Rok'n'Band

=== Number-one singles by month ===
Monthly charted #1 songs and highest charted counting among domestic songs only

No.	Month	Issue date	Number-one	Artist	Top domestic song	Top domestic artist
re	25	January 2015	"All About That Bass"	Meghan Trainor	"Lovin' Me"	Maraaya
re	26	February 2015	"All About That Bass"	Meghan Trainor	"Lovin' Me"	Maraaya
16	27	March 2015	"Love Me Like You Do"	Ellie Goulding	"Here for You"	Maraaya
17	28	April 2015	"Here for You"	Maraaya	"Here for You"	Maraaya
17	29	May 2015	"Here for You"	Maraaya	"Here for You"	Maraaya
18	30	June 2015	"Cheerleader"	OMI	"Here for You"	Maraaya
18	31	July 2015	"Cheerleader"	OMI	"Nekaj med nama"	Iztok Easy Novak
18	32	August 2015	"Cheerleader"	OMI	"Here for You"	Maraaya
19	33	September 2015	"Photograph"	Ed Sheeran	"Here for You"	Maraaya
20	34	October 2015	"Reality"	Lost Frequencies feat. Janieck Devy	"Sladoled z vesoljem"	Nina Pušlar
21	35	November 2015	"Hello"	Adele	"Stara dobra"	Jan Plestenjak
21	36	December 2015	"Hello"	Adele	"Stara dobra"	Jan Plestenjak
