= Slovenia in the Eurovision Song Contest 2015 =

- Eurovision Song Contest 2015
- Participating broadcaster: Radiotelevizija Slovenija (RTVSLO)
- Country: Slovenia
- Selection process: Evrovizijska Melodija 2015
- Selection date: 28 February 2015

Competing entry
- Song: "Here for You"
- Artist: Maraaya
- Songwriters: Raay; Marjetka Vovk; Charlie Mason

Placement
- Semi-final result: Qualified (5th, 92 points)
- Final result: 14th, 39 points

Participation chronology

Slovenia was represented at the Eurovision Song Contest 2015 with the song "Here for You" written by Raay, Marjetka Vovk and Charlie Mason, and performed by the duo Maraaya, which consists of Raay and Marjetka Vovk. The Slovene participating broadcaster, Radiotelevizija Slovenija (RTVSLO), organised the national final Evrovizijska Melodija 2015 in order to select its entry for the contest. Eight entries competed in the national final where the winner was selected over two rounds of voting. In the first round, the top two entries were selected by a three-member jury panel. In the second round, "Here for You" performed by Maraaya was selected as the winner entirely by a public televote.

Slovenia was drawn to compete in the second semi-final of the Eurovision Song Contest which took place on 21 May 2015. Performing during the show in position 16, "Here for You" was announced among the top 10 entries of the second semi-final and therefore qualified to compete in the final on 23 May. It was later revealed that Slovenia placed fifth out of the 17 participating countries in the semi-final with 92 points. In the final, Slovenia performed in position 1 and placed fourteenth out of the 27 participating countries, scoring 39 points.

== Background ==
Prior to the 2015 contest, Radiotelevizija Slovenija (RTVSLO) had participated in the Eurovision Song Contest representing Slovenia twenty times since its first entry in 1993. Its highest placing in the contest, to this point, has been seventh place, achieved on two occasions: in 1995 with the song "Prisluhni mi" performed by Darja Švajger and in 2001 with the song "Energy" performed by Nuša Derenda. The country's only other top ten result was achieved in 1997 when Tanja Ribič performing "Zbudi se" placed tenth. Since the introduction of semi-finals to the format of the contest in 2004, Slovenia had thus far only managed to qualify to the final on three occasions. In 2014, "Round and Round" performed by Tinkara Kovač qualified to the final and placed twenty-fifth.

As part of its duties as participating broadcaster, RTVSLO organises the selection of its entry in the Eurovision Song Contest and broadcasts the event in the country. The broadcaster confirmed its participation in the 2015 contest on 10 October 2014. RTVSLO has traditionally selected its entry through a national final entitled Evrovizijska Melodija (EMA), which has been produced with variable formats. To this point, the broadcaster has only foregone the use of this national final in 2013 when the entry was internally selected. For 2015, the broadcaster opted to organise Evrovizijska Melodija 2015 (EMA 2015) to select its entry.

== Before Eurovision ==
=== EMA 2015 ===
EMA 2015 was the 19th edition of the Slovenian national final format Evrovizijska Melodija (EMA), used by RTV Slovenija to select Slovenia's entry for the Eurovision Song Contest 2015. The competition took place at the RTV Slovenija Studio 1 in Ljubljana, hosted by Nejc Šmit and former Slovenian Eurovision entrants Darja Švajger (1995, 1999), Maja Keuc (2011) and Tinkara Kovač (2014) and was broadcast on TV SLO 1 and online via the broadcaster's website rtvslo.si. An online backstage broadcast at RTV Slovenija's official website also occurred concurrently with the competition.

==== Format ====
Eight songs competed in a televised show where the winner was selected over two rounds of voting. In the first round, a three-member expert jury selected two finalists out of the eight competing songs to proceed to a superfinal. Each member of the expert jury assigned a score of 1 (lowest score) to 5 (highest score) to each song with the top two being determined by the songs that receive the highest overall scores when the jury votes are combined. Ties were broken by giving priority to the song(s) that achieved a higher number of top scores (5), which would be followed by each juror indicating their preferred song should a tie still have persisted. In the superfinal, public televoting exclusively determined the winner. In case of technical problems with the televote, the jury would have voted to determine the winner in a similar process as in the first round of the competition.

==== Competing entries ====
Artists and composers were able to submit their entries to the broadcaster between 24 November 2014 and 21 December 2014. Several artists and composers were also directly invited by the broadcaster to submit entries. 145 entries were received by the broadcaster during the submission period. An expert committee consisting of Darja Švajger (1995 and 1999 Slovenian Eurovision entrant), Matej Wolf (musician, instrumentalist, arranger, producer and music teacher), Aleksander Radić (Head of the Slovenian delegation at the Eurovision Song Contest) and Jernej Vene (music editor for Radio Val 202) selected eight artists and songs for the competition from the received submissions. The competing artists were announced on 15 January 2015. Among the competing artists was former Slovenian Eurovision contestant Martina Majerle who represented Slovenia in 2009 alongside Quartissimo.

==== Final ====
EMA 2015 took place on 28 February 2015. In addition to the performances of the competing entries, Nadiya Bichkova, Brigita Vrhovnik Dorič and Maestro Dance Crew performed as guests. The winner was selected over two rounds of voting. In the first round, a three-member jury panel selected two entries to proceed to the second round. The jury consisted of the three female hosts Darja Švajger, Maja Keuc and Tinkara Kovač. In the second round, a public televote selected "Here for You" performed by Maraaya as the winner.

Final – 28 February 2015
R/O	Artist	Song	Songwriter(s)	Result
1	Alya and Neno Belan	"Misunderstandings"	Neno Belan, Zvonimir Zrilić, Tonči Pajkin	—N/a
2	Tim Kores	"Once Too Many Times"	Dejan Radičevič, Tim Kores	—N/a
3	Jana Šušteršič	"Glas srca"	Aleš Klinar, Tina Muc	—N/a
4	I.C.E.	"Vse mogoče"	Jalen Štremfelj, Renata Mohorič, Matej Sušnik, Blaž Sotošek, Tine Janžek	—N/a
5	Clemens	"Mava to"	Klemen Mramor, Tina Muc	—N/a
6	Maraaya	"Here for You"	Raay, Marjetka Vovk, Charlie Mason	Advanced
7	Rudi Bučar and Figoni	"Šaltinka"	Rudi Bučar	Advanced
8	Martina Majerle	"Alive"	Andrej Babić	—N/a

Superfinal – 28 February 2015
R/O	Artist	Song	Televote	Place
1	Maraaya	"Here for You"	7,311	1
2	Rudi Bučar and Figoni	"Šaltinka"	5,449	2

=== Promotion ===
Maraaya's promotion for "Here for You" as the Slovenian Eurovision entry included a performance on 18 April during the Eurovision in Concert event which was held at the Melkweg venue in Amsterdam, Netherlands and hosted by Cornald Maas and Edsilia Rombley.

== At Eurovision ==
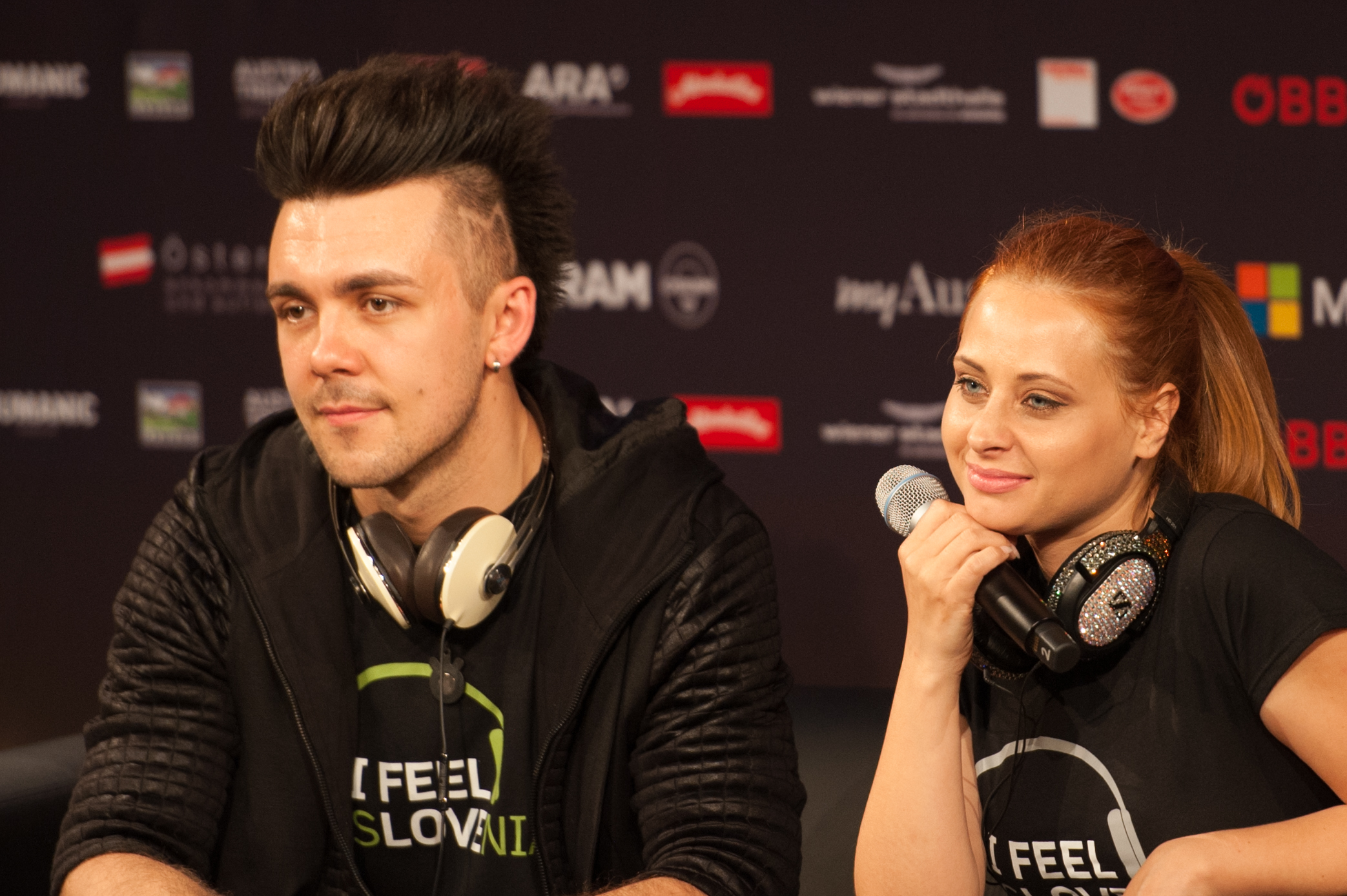
Maraaya during a press meet and greet

According to Eurovision rules, all nations with the exceptions of the host country and the "Big Five" (France, Germany, Italy, Spain and the United Kingdom) are required to qualify from one of two semi-finals in order to compete for the final; the top ten countries from each semi-final progress to the final. In the 2015 contest, Australia also competed directly in the final as an invited guest nation. The European Broadcasting Union (EBU) split up the competing countries into five different pots based on voting patterns from previous contests, with countries with favourable voting histories put into the same pot. On 26 January 2015, an allocation draw was held which placed each country into one of the two semi-finals, as well as which half of the show they would perform in. Slovenia was placed into the second semi-final, to be held on 21 May 2015, and was scheduled to perform in the second half of the show.

Once all the competing songs for the 2015 contest had been released, the running order for the semi-finals was decided by the shows' producers rather than through another draw, so that similar songs were not placed next to each other. Slovenia was set to perform in position 16, following the entry from Cyprus and before the entry from Poland.

In Slovenia, the semi-finals were televised on TV SLO 2 and the final was televised on TV SLO 1. All shows featured commentated by Andrej Hofer. The contest was also broadcast via radio with the second semi-final and final airing on Radio Val 202. The Slovenian spokesperson, who announced the Slovenian votes during the final, was 2014 Slovenian Eurovision entrant Tinkara Kovač.

=== Semi-final ===
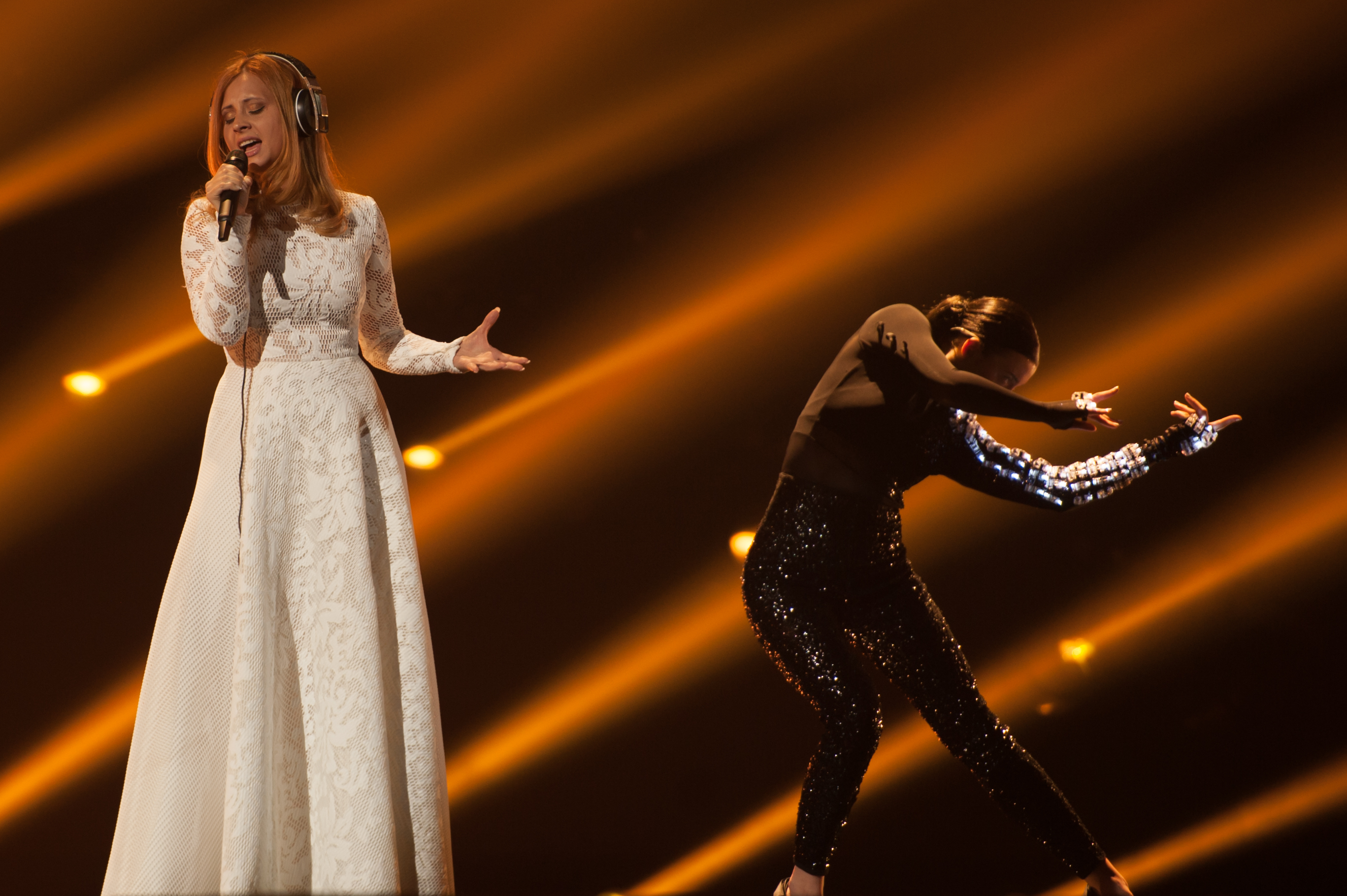
Marjetka Vovk and dancer Lara Balodis Slekovec during a rehearsal before the second semi-final

Maraaya took part in technical rehearsals on 14 and 16 May, followed by dress rehearsals on 20 and 21 May. This included the jury final on 20 May where the professional juries of each country watched and voted on the competing entries.

The Slovenian performance featured the members of Maraaya joined by a dancer on stage who simulated the playing of a violin. The duo performed in outfits designed by Vesna Mirtelj: Marjetka Vovk wore a long white dress while Raay wore a casual black outfit. The dancer was dressed in black with glowing elements on her sleeve. Marjetka also wore Sennheiser brand headphones, which according to the performer was part of her stage image: "To be honest, some years ago I was afraid to be on the stage. I always felt more comfortable in a studio. I've asked Raay if it would be okay to perform with the headphones on and that's how this idea was born." The stage colours were bronze and blue. Maraaya was joined by three off-stage backing vocalists: Manca Špik, Nika Zorjan and Karin Zemljič. The dancer featured during the performance was Lara Balodis Slekovec.

At the end of the show, Slovenia was announced as having finished in the top ten and subsequently qualifying for the grand final. It was later revealed that the Slovenia placed fifth in the semi-final, receiving a total of 92 points.

=== Final ===
Shortly after the second semi-final, a winner's press conference was held for the ten qualifying countries. As part of this press conference, the qualifying artists took part in a draw to determine which half of the grand final they would subsequently participate in. This draw was done in the order the countries were announced during the semi-final. Slovenia was drawn to compete in the first half. Following this draw, the shows' producers decided upon the running order of the final, as they had done for the semi-finals. Slovenia was subsequently placed to perform in position 1, before the entry from France.

Maraaya once again took part in dress rehearsals on 22 and 23 May before the final, including the jury final where the professional juries cast their final votes before the live show. The duo performed a repeat of their semi-final performance during the final on 23 May. At the conclusion of the voting, Slovenia placed fourteenth with 39 points.

=== Voting ===
Voting during the three shows consisted of 50 percent public televoting and 50 percent from a jury deliberation. The jury consisted of five music industry professionals who were citizens of the country they represent, with their names published before the contest to ensure transparency. This jury was asked to judge each contestant based on: vocal capacity; the stage performance; the song's composition and originality; and the overall impression by the act. In addition, no member of a national jury could be related in any way to any of the competing acts in such a way that they cannot vote impartially and independently. The individual rankings of each jury member were released shortly after the grand final.

Following the release of the full split voting by the EBU after the conclusion of the competition, it was revealed that Slovenia had placed nineteenth with the public televote and fifteenth with the jury vote in the final. In the public vote, Slovenia scored 27 points, while with the jury vote, Slovenia scored 36 points. In the second semi-final, Slovenia placed seventh with the public televote with 95 points and sixth with the jury vote, scoring 84 points.

Below is a breakdown of points awarded to Slovenia and awarded by Slovenia in the second semi-final and grand final of the contest, and the breakdown of the jury voting and televoting conducted during the two shows:

==== Points awarded to Slovenia ====
Points awarded to Slovenia (Semi-final 2)
Score	Country
12 points	Azerbaijan; Montenegro
10 points	
8 points	Latvia
7 points	Lithuania
6 points	Germany; Iceland; Israel
5 points	Australia; Poland
4 points	Norway; Portugal; Switzerland
3 points	Cyprus; Czech Republic; Italy; Malta
2 points	
1 point	San Marino

Points awarded to Slovenia (Final)
Score	Country
12 points	
10 points	
8 points	Macedonia
7 points	
6 points	Israel
5 points	Serbia
4 points	Lithuania; Montenegro
3 points	Azerbaijan; Latvia
2 points	Iceland
1 point	Finland; Norway; Poland; Sweden

==== Points awarded by Slovenia ====
Points awarded by Slovenia (Semi-final 2)
Score	Country
12 points	Sweden
10 points	Montenegro
8 points	Latvia
7 points	Cyprus
6 points	Norway
5 points	Israel
4 points	Portugal
3 points	Czech Republic
2 points	Poland
1 point	Ireland

Points awarded by Slovenia (Final)
Score	Country
12 points	Sweden
10 points	Montenegro
8 points	Italy
7 points	Latvia
6 points	Serbia
5 points	Russia
4 points	Norway
3 points	Belgium
2 points	Australia
1 point	Cyprus

==== Detailed voting results ====
The following members comprised the Slovene jury:

- Tinkara Kovač (jury chairperson) – singer, musician, composer, lyricist, represented Slovenia in the 2014 contest
- Miha Gorše – musician, producer, composer
- Sandra Feketija – singer
- Alex Volasko – singer, composer, producer
- Andrej Šifrer – singer, composer, lyricist

Detailed voting results from Slovenia (Semi-final 2)
R/O	Country	T. Kovač	M. Gorše	S. Feketija	A. Volasko	A. Šifrer	Jury Rank	Televote Rank	Combined Rank	Points
01	Lithuania	16	6	15	13	11	14	9	11	
02	Ireland	5	10	14	7	5	7	14	10	1
03	San Marino	14	16	16	15	16	16	15	16	
04	Montenegro	11	8	4	8	4	6	1	2	10
05	Malta	8	15	6	2	13	8	16	14	
06	Norway	4	3	3	6	2	3	6	5	6
07	Portugal	3	9	8	4	6	4	11	7	4
08	Czech Republic	6	11	5	14	12	11	7	8	3
09	Israel	7	7	10	16	7	9	4	6	5
10	Latvia	2	2	2	5	1	2	5	3	8
11	Azerbaijan	9	5	9	9	15	10	13	13	
12	Iceland	15	13	12	11	14	15	12	15	
13	Sweden	1	1	1	3	3	1	2	1	12
14	Switzerland	13	14	11	12	9	13	10	12	
15	Cyprus	10	4	7	1	8	5	3	4	7
16	Slovenia									
17	Poland	12	12	13	10	10	12	8	9	2

Detailed voting results from Slovenia (Final)
R/O	Country	T. Kovač	M. Gorše	S. Feketija	A. Volasko	A. Šifrer	Jury Rank	Televote Rank	Combined Rank	Points
01	Slovenia									
02	France	20	21	10	18	20	20	24	24	
03	Israel	15	10	15	21	8	14	9	12	
04	Estonia	11	18	22	12	10	15	8	11	
05	United Kingdom	12	20	11	13	2	10	21	16	
06	Armenia	18	26	24	24	24	25	26	26	
07	Lithuania	19	17	21	15	11	18	19	19	
08	Serbia	24	11	14	10	9	12	1	5	6
09	Norway	8	5	9	2	3	3	12	7	4
10	Sweden	3	2	2	6	6	2	5	1	12
11	Cyprus	13	4	3	1	7	4	15	10	1
12	Australia	7	13	6	5	4	6	11	9	2
13	Belgium	1	8	5	19	19	9	7	8	3
14	Austria	23	12	12	9	12	13	16	14	
15	Greece	10	24	19	23	21	21	25	25	
16	Montenegro	9	6	4	8	5	5	3	2	10
17	Germany	16	16	16	16	16	17	20	20	
18	Poland	22	22	23	20	15	22	22	23	
19	Latvia	2	1	1	3	1	1	10	4	7
20	Romania	14	15	20	14	23	19	18	18	
21	Spain	25	14	18	22	25	23	17	22	
22	Hungary	17	23	25	25	14	24	13	17	
23	Georgia	6	19	13	17	22	16	23	21	
24	Azerbaijan	21	9	8	11	17	11	14	13	
25	Russia	4	3	17	4	18	8	6	6	5
26	Albania	26	25	26	26	26	26	4	15	
27	Italy	5	7	7	7	13	7	2	3	8
