= My Way Is My Decision =

Single by Tina Maze
- Released: 26 October 2012
- Genre: Pop
- Length: 3:32
- Label: Nika Records / Raay Production
- Composers: Matjaž Jelen; Raay
- Lyricists: Charlie Mason; Leon Oblak
- Producer: Raay

My Way Is My Decision is the first single of Slovenian Alpine skier Tina Maze released in 2012.

== Background ==
While in primary school, in addition to skiing, Maze played piano. During preparations for the 2013 season she recorded her first song "My Way Is My Decision". She also blogged about the story on her trip into music. The news of Maze becoming a "popstar" or "rockstar" was a celebrity news in her country and she got some attention in foreign media too.

== Song writing ==
The song "My Way Is My Decision" was produced by Raay, one of the top Slovenian producers and music written by Matjaž Jelen & Raay, lyrics by Charlie Mason and Leon Oblak. It is a modern mainstream radio-friendly up-tempo song with a hint of rock. It was released on 26 October, the day before the first race of the season in Solden. The music video has become the most viewed new video on YouTube by a Slovenian music artist as it reached over 400,000 views in less than three days, which is Slovenia's fastest growing video in music business industry. In February 2013, it reached 1,000,000 views.

== Credits and personnel ==
- Raay – music, arranger, producer
- Matjaž Jelen – music
- Charlie Mason – lyrics
- Leon Oblak – lyrics
- Tina Maze – vocals

== Charts ==
=== Weekly charts ===
Chart (2014)	Peak position
Slovenia (SloTop50)	12
