= It's Complicated (Maraaya song) =

2017 song performed by Maraaya

Single by Maraaya featuring BQL
- Released: 26 May 2017 (premiere); 7 June 2017 (official); 17 June 2017 (iTunes, Spotify)
- Genre: pop
- Length: 3:40
- Label: Nika Records
- Songwriter(s): Raay; Marjetka Vovk; Charlie Mason
- Producer(s): Raay Music

Maraaya singles chronology
"Nothing Left for Me" (2016)	"It's Complicated" (2017)	"Diamond Duck" (2017)

BQL singles chronology
"Heart of Gold" (2017)	"It's Complicated" (2017)	"Ni predaje, ni umika" (2017)

Music video
- "It's Complicated" on YouTube

"Sjaj"

Single by Maraaya featuring BQL

from the album CMC Festival Vodice 2017
- Released: 18 April 2017 (Deezer); 20 April 2017 (iTunes); 28 April 2017 (prepremiere); 9 June 2017 (official)
- Genre: pop
- Length: 3:40
- Label: Croatia Records; Nika Rec.
- Songwriter(s): Raay; Marjetka Vovk; Fayo
- Producer(s): Raay Music

Music video
- "Sjaj" on YouTube

"It's Complicated" is a song by Slovene duo Maraaya, featuring Slovene duo BQL. It was written by Raay, Marjetka Vovk and Charlie Mason. This is Maraaya's fifth and BQL's third single which premiered on 26 May 2017 in front of the live audience on the Cankar street in Ljubljana. This song and video was officially released on 7 June 2017 at Nika Records. Since 17 June 2017 available worldwide on iTunes, Spotify and Deezer.

== Music video ==
The video was shot in Spain with international cooperation of Estonian Vita Pictura Productions. According to Raay, Maraaya and BQL do not perform in the video with the intention to appear more mysterious, as it is popular with videos these days.

== Other versions ==
=== Croatian version ===
"Sjaj", is the Croatian-language version of the song "It's Complicated", with the Croatian lyrics written by Fayo. It was officially released on 9 June 2017 by Croatia Records and Nika Records. Although the song already premiered at Deezer on 18 April 2017, it was released at iTunes on 20 April 2017 and prepremiered at CMC Vodice 2017 album on 28 April 2017.

On 10 June 2017, they performed at the biggest Croatian pop music festival CMC Vodice 2017, where they were invited, as organizers chose this single for this festival.

== Formats and track listings ==
- Digital download
1. "It's Complicated" – 3:40
- Digital download (Croatian version)
1. "Sjaj" (Croatian version) – 3:40

== Credits and personnel ==
- Raay – music, lyrics, producer
- Marjetka Vovk – music, lyrics, vocals
- Charlie Mason – lyrics
- Raay Music (Raay, Art Hunter, T. Snare) – production, arrangement
- Anej Piletič (BQL) – guitar, back vocals
- Rok Piletič (BQL) – back vocals

== Charts ==
=== Weekly charts ===
==== It's Complicated ====
Chart (2017)	Peak position
Slovenia (SloTop50)	9

== Release history ==
=== It's Complicated ===
Region	Date	Format	Label
Slovenia	26 May 2017	Cankar street, Ljubljana (premiere)	Nika Records
Official / Music video	7 June 2017	radio and video release (official)	Nika Records
Worldwide	17 June 2017	Digital download (iTunes, Spotify)	Nika Records

=== Sjaj ===
Region	Date	Format	Label
Worldwide	18 April 2017	Digital download (Deezer)	Croatia Records; Nika Records
Worldwide	20 April 2017	Digital download (iTunes)	Croatia Records; Nika Records
Prepremiere	28 April 2017	CMC Vodice 2017 (album)	Croatia Records; Nika Records
Official / Music video	9 June 2017	radio and video release (official)	Croatia Records; Nika Records
