= Nothing Left for Me =

Single by Maraaya
- Released: 27 February 2016 (premiere); 1 March 2016 (official)
- Genre: Indie; pop
- Length: 3:35
- Label: Dance and Love Srl.
- Producer(s): Raay

Maraaya singles chronology
| "Living Again" (2015) | "Nothing Left for Me" (2016) | "It's Complicated" (2017) |

Music video
- "Nothing Left for Me" on YouTube

"Nothing Left for Me" is a song by Slovene duo Maraaya. This is their fourth single released on 27 February 2016 at the Slovenia in the Eurovision Song Contest 2016 final night.

== Credits and personnel ==
- Raay – music, producer
- Marjetka Vovk – lyrics, vocals

== Charts ==
| Chart (2016) | Peak position |
|---|---|
| Slovenia (SloTop50) | 18 |

== Release history ==
| Region | Date | Format | Label |
|---|---|---|---|
| Slovenia | 27 February 2016 | EMA 2016 (premiere) | Dance and Love |
| Official | 1 March 2016 | official release (radio) | Dance and Love |
