= Heart of Gold (BQL song) =

Single by BQL
- Released: 18 February 2017 (premiere); 28 February 2017 (iTunes); 3 July 2017 (video)
- Recorded: 2016
- Genre: pop
- Length: 2:50
- Label: Nika Records; Raay Music
- Songwriters: Raay; Marjetka Vovk; Anej Piletič
- Producer: Raay Production

BQL singles chronology
"Muza" (2016)	"Heart of Gold" (2017)	"It's Complicated" (2017)

Music video
- "Heart of Gold" on YouTube

"Heart of Gold" is a song by Slovene duo BQL. It was written by Raay, Marjetka Vovk and Anej Piletič. The track was released on 18 February 2017 as the duo’s second single and peaked at number 1 on the Slovenian Singles Chart.

== Formats and track listings ==
- Digital download
1. "Heart of Gold" – 2:50

== Credits and personnel ==
- Anej Piletič – lyrics, guitar, vocals
- Raay – music, producer
- Marjetka Vovk – music
- Rok Piletič – vocals

== Charts ==
=== Weekly charts ===
Chart (2017)	Peak position
Slovenia (SloTop50)	1

=== Year-end charts ===
Chart (2017)	Peak position
Slovenia (SloTop50)	2
Chart (2018)	Peak position
Slovenia (SloTop50)	44

== Release history ==
Region	Date	Format	Label
Slovenia	18 February 2017	EMA 2017 (premiere)	Nika Records; Raay Music
Worldwide	28 February 2017	Digital download (iTunes)	Nika Records; Raay Music
