= Lovin' Me =

Single by Maraaya
- Released: 28 April 2014 (premiere); 30 April 2014 (iTunes)
- Genre: Indie; pop
- Length: 3:45 (radio edit); 3:29 (tobix remix)
- Label: BIP Records; Dance and Love
- Songwriters: Raay; Marjetka Vovk; Charlie Mason
- Producers: Raay; Boris Perme

Maraaya singles chronology
"Lovin' Me" (2014)	"Here for You" (2015)

Music video
- "Lovin' Me" on YouTube

"Lovin' Me" is the debut single by Slovene duo Maraaya, released on 28 April 2014 by Bip Records and Dance and Love. It was written by Raay, Marjetka Vovk and Charlie Mason.

== Chart performance ==
It was also listed on Polish "Bravo Hits Zima 2015" compilation. This song was among top ten selling singles in Italy and was rankend at 34th place at German DJ's Dance Top 100 singles chart.

"Lovin' Me" peak positions at the official singles charts: it was ranked on 13th place at the Slovenian SloTop50 chart, on 52nd at the Italian FIMI chart and on 83rd at the Belgian (Flanders) Ultratip 100 chart.

== Formats and track listings ==
- SWE" CD promo single
1. "Lovin' Me" (Radio Edit) – 3:49
2. "Lovin' Me" (Tobix Remix) – 3:29
- NED" CD promo single
1. "Lovin' Me" (Radio Edit) – 3:45

== Charts ==
=== Weekly charts ===
Chart (2014)	Peak position
Belgium (Ultratip Bubbling Under Flanders)	83
Italy (FIMI)	52
Slovenia (SloTop50)	13

Chart (2015)	Peak position
Slovenia (SloTop50)	13

=== Year-end charts ===
Chart (2015)	Peak position
Slovenia (SloTop50)	46

== Release history ==
Region	Date	Format	Label
Music video	28 April 2014	YouTube official video (premiere)	Bip Records; Dance and Love
Worldwide	30 April 2014	Digital download (iTunes)	Bip Records; Dance and Love

== Credits and personnel ==
- Raay – music, producer
- Marjetka Vovk – lyrics, vocals
- Charlie Mason – lyrics
- Bris Perme – producer
