= Diamond Duck =

Single by Maraaya
- Released: 22 September 2017 (worldwide); 2 October 2017 (Slovenia)
- Genre: pop
- Length: 2:28
- Label: Warner Music

Maraaya singles chronology
"It's Complicated" (2017)	"Diamond Duck" (2017)

Music video
- "Diamond Duck" on YouTube

"Diamond Duck" is a song by Slovene duo Maraaya and their sixth single released by Warner Music on 22 September 2017 and ten days later in Slovenia. The song talks about the current political situation around the world. The song's title also refers to the sporting term in cricket.

== Background ==
With this song they made a career turnover when they signed the contract with Warner Music and became the first Slovenian artists to sign with one of the "big three" recording companies and great chance to enter on worldwide music stage. This is the 341th song in a row written or co-written by Raay.

== Music video ==
Like their previous video for "It's Complicated", this one was also shot with Estonian Vita Pictura Productions. The video displays the lyrics in a subtitle style along with emoji symbols.

== Formats and track listings ==
- Digital download
1. "Diamond Duck" – 2:28

== Credits and personnel ==
- Raay – music
- Marjetka Vovk – vocals

== Charts ==
=== Weekly charts ===
Chart (2017)	Peak position
Slovenia (SloTop50)	1

== Release history ==
Region	Date	Format	Label
Worldwide	22 September 2017	Digital download, YouTube	Warner Music
Slovenia	2 October 2017	Slovenian radio stations	
