= Muza (song) =

Single by BQL
- Released: 30 June 2016 (premiere); 28 August 2016 (iTunes)
- Recorded: 2015
- Genre: Pop
- Length: 3:49
- Label: Nika Records; Raay Music
- Songwriters: Raay; Tina Piš
- Producer: Raay Production

BQL singles chronology
"Muza" (2016)	"Heart of Gold" (2017)

Music video
- "Muza" on YouTube

"Muza" (Eng.: Muse) is a song by the Slovene duo BQL. It was written by Raay and Tina Piš. It was their first single released in Slovenia, on 30 June 2016. The song reached number 1 on the Slovenian Singles Chart.

== Formats and track listings ==
- Digital download
1. "Muza" – 3:49

== Credits and personnel ==
- Raay – music, producer
- Anej Piletič – vocals, guitar
- Rok Piletič – vocals
- Tina Piš – lyrics

== Charts ==
=== Weekly charts ===
Chart (2016)	Peak position
Slovenia (SloTop50)	1
Chart (2017)	Peak position
Slovenia (SloTop50)	20

=== Year-end charts ===
Chart (2016)	Peak position
Slovenia (SloTop50)	21
Chart (2017)	Peak position
Slovenia (SloTop50)	49

== Release history ==
Region	Date	Format	Label
Slovenia	30 June 2016	radio premiere (Slovenia)	Nika Records; Raay Music
Worldwide	28 August 2016	Digital download (iTunes)	Nika Records; Raay Music
Music video	1 September 2016	YouTube official video	Nika Records; Raay Music
