= Nika Zorjan =

Slovenian singer and songwriter (born 1992)

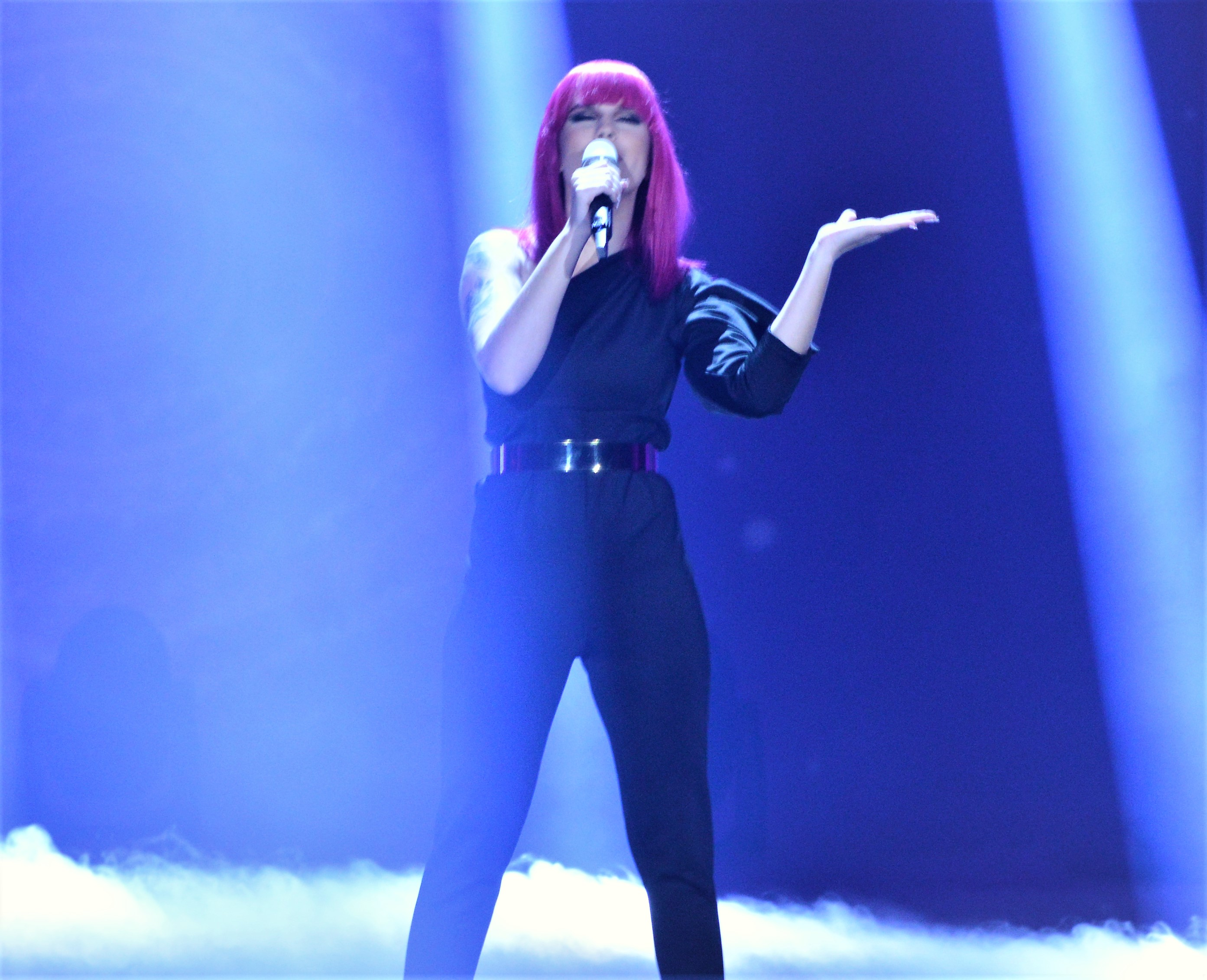
- Zorjan performing in 2017

Background information
- Born: 3 December 1992 (age 33); Petanjci, Slovenia
- Genres: Pop
- Occupations: Singer; songwriter
- Instrument: Vocals
- Years active: 2010–present
- Label: Raay Music

Nika Zorjan (born 3 December 1992) is a Slovenian singer and songwriter. Zorjan began her music career in 2010 as a contestant on the first season of Slovenija ima talent, the Slovenian version of Got Talent, later signing with Raay Music, the record label of Slovene duo Maraaya. She made her debut in 2012 with the single "Čas za nas", which was written by Maraaya. She later released the single "Nasmeh življenja" in 2013, which went on to become one of the most-played singles on Slovenian radio of the year in 2013 and 2014.

Zorjan has attempted to represent Slovenia in the Eurovision Song Contest on three occasions; in 2012, 2017, and 2018. She also performed as a backing vocalist for the Slovenian act in 2014 and 2015.

== Early life ==
Nika Zorjan was born on 3 December 1992 in Petanjci, a small village near the city of Murska Sobota. She grew up in a musical family, with her grandfather Leopold playing the accordion, and her father Janez playing guitar in the Slovenian band Nova Legija.

== Career ==
Zorjan began her career in 2010, after becoming a contestant on the first season of Slovenija ima talent, the Slovenian version of Got Talent, but did not place as a semifinalist. In 2012, she began taking part in Misija Evrovizija, where she placed third behind Eva Boto and Nika & Eva Prusnik. After competing, she was signed by Raay to his record label Raay Music. She released her debut single "Čas za nas" that year, which went on to become a success in Slovenia, being nominated for the 2012 Eurodanceweb Award for Slovenia. Her follow-up single "Problemom sredinc" was released later that same year.

In 2014, Zorjan was a backing singer at the Eurovision Song Contest 2014, performing with Tinkara Kovač. She later competed at EMA 2017, attempting to represent Slovenia in the Eurovision Song Contest 2017 with the song "Fse". She placed fifth overall. Zorjan also competed in EMA 2018 with the song "Uspavanka", but did not qualify to the final.

Zorjan often sings also in Prekmurje Slovene.

== Discography ==
=== Singles ===
Title	Year	Peak chart positions	Album
Title	Year	SLO	Album
"Čas za nas"	2012	—	Non-album singles
"Problemom sredinc"	2012	—	Non-album singles
"Nasmeh življenja"	2013	4	Non-album singles
"Po dežju"	2014	12	Non-album singles
"Fse"	2017	5	Non-album singles
"Ni predaje, ni umika" (with BQL)	2017	6	Non-album singles
"Uspavanka"	2018	17	Non-album singles
"Luna" (Nika Zorjan ft. Jonatan Haller)	2018	2	Non-album singles
"Za vedno (Za skaus)"	2018	-	Non-album singles
"Ola ola" (Nika Zorjan & Isaac Palma)	2019	5	Non-album singles
"Vruće" (Note: Hrvaška različica pesmi Vroče (SIT).) (BQL & Nika Zorjan ft. Isaac Palma)	2019	—	Non-album singles
"Na plažo"	2019	22	Non-album singles
"Blamaža" (Note: Hrvaška različica pesmi Na plažo.) (Nika Zorjan & 8rasta9 ft. Svanky)	2019	—	Non-album singles
"Apokalipsa" (Nika Zorjan x 8rasta9)	2019	—	Non-album singles
"Svima po mojito" / "Mojito"	2020	—	Non-album singles
"Poljubi me na božič"	2020	—	Non-album singles
"Zate dovolj"	2021		Non-album singles
"Ljubi ne ljubi"	2021		Non-album singles
"—" denotes releases that did not chart or were not released.

==== Featured ====
Title	Year	Peak chart positions	Album
Title	Year	SLO	Album
"Nekaj v zraku" (Tangels featuring Nika Zorjan and April)	2012	—	Non-album singles
"Lajf je moj" (Ramus featuring Nika Zorjan)	2015	—	Non-album singles
"Vroče" (S.I.T. — BQL, Palma, Sešek, Jazbec...)	2018	5	Non-album singles
"—" denotes releases that did not chart or were not released.

=== Other charted songs ===
Title	Year	Peak chart positions	Album
Title	Year	SLO	Album
"White Christmas / Bel božič" (with Maraaya, BQL, Luka Basi, Špik, Jazbec and Ula)	2017	31	Non-album singles
"—" denotes releases that did not chart or were not released.
