= BQL (group) =

Slovene pop group

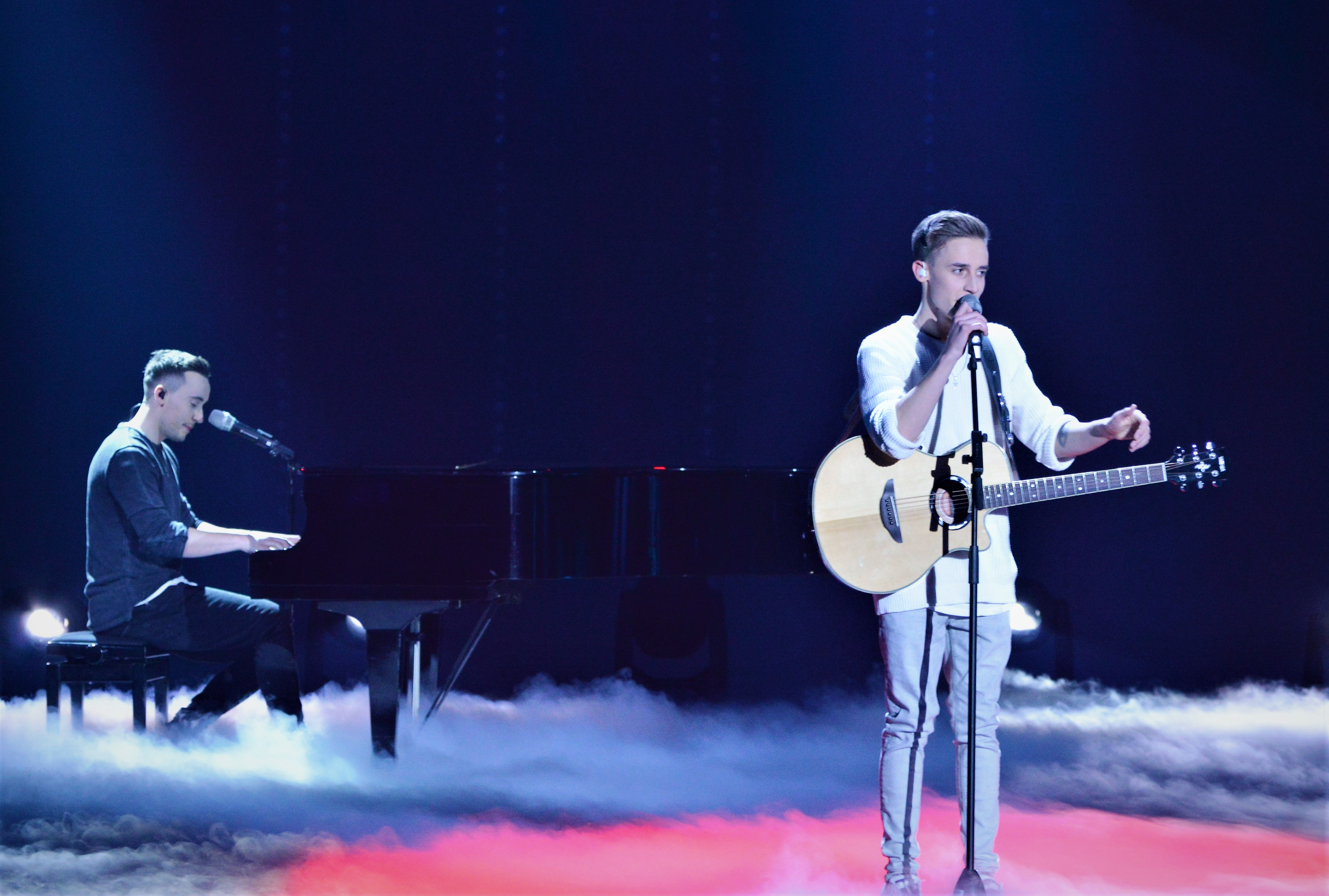

Background information
- Origin: Prevalje, Slovenia
- Genres: Pop
- Years active: 2016–present
- Labels: Nika Records; Raay Production
- Members: Anej Piletič; Rok Piletič
- Website: facebook.com/BQLpage

BQL are a Slovene duo from Prevalje founded in 2016. It consists of two brothers; Rok (vocal, piano) and Anej Piletič (vocal, guitar). They are the first domestic artists at the Slovenian official singles charts SloTop50, who managed to hit the peak chart positions with two singles: one week with "Muza" and four weeks with "Heart of Gold".

== Career ==
=== 2010–2013: Slovenia's Got Talent ===
Both brothers have competed in Slovenia's Got Talent (Slovenija ima talent). The older brother, Rok, competed as a solo act in the 1st season (2010) and together with Matej Prikeržnik in the 3rd season (2013). The younger brother, Anej, was one of the finalists in 4th season (2014).

In 2015 they began to publish various covers on social media together and "Ledena", a cover song of Slovenian alternative rock band Siddharta, draw the most attention of all.

=== 2016: First single ===
In June 2016 they released their first single "Muza" (Muse), acoustic pop song with electronic layer under the name of BQL (short for be cool). Song was written and produced by Raay and his wife Marjetka Vovk, more known as duo Maraaya, recorded in their studio. The song became an instant hit which the fourth most played song of the year 2016 in Slovenia.

It took the peak position at the Slovenian official singles charts SloTop50 and twenty-first position at the year end chart in 2016. On 1 September 2016 they released a YouTube video for the song.

=== 2017: Second at EMA ===
They performed at the EMA 2017 with their second single "Heart of Gold". The song got more than 370 thousand views on YouTube in one week. They won the first place with public votes and they took only the fourth place by the jury. Unfortunately that wasn't enough to win EMA 2017, instead they were second in the final. This is already their second single to hit the peak chart position at the Slovenian official singles charts SloTop50 and became first Slovenian artists with at least two singles in number one.

In March 2017 "Heart of Gold" was ranked on Spotify, a Swedish global internet music platform, appeared in "10 Tracks You Must Hear" category.

On 26 May 2017, Maraaya featuring BQL premiered their fifth single "It's Complicated" and the video for the song at the same time on the Cankar street in Ljubljana. This single was officially released on 7 June 2017 and Croatian version two days later.

=== 2018: Second attempt at EMA ===
The next year, the duo took part again at the EMA 2018. After performing the song "Ptica" during the semifinal on 17 February, they managed to qualify to the final, where they sang an English version of their song, named "Promise". For the second year in a row, BQL had the highest score from the televote, but they took only the third place by the jury. Overall, they ended second once again and didn't get to represent Slovenia in the Eurovision Song Contest 2018.

== Discography ==
=== Singles ===
==== As lead artist ====
Title	Year	Peak chart positions	Album
Title	Year	SLO	Album
"Muza"	2016	1.	Non-album singles
"Heart of Gold"	2017	1.	Non-album singles
"Ni predaje, ni umika" (BQL & Nika Zorjan)	2017	6.	Non-album singles
"Zimska"	2018	—	Non-album singles
"Promise / Ptica"	2018	11. / 14.	Non-album singles
"Peru"	2018	12.	Non-album singles
"Ko je ni"	2019	40.	Non-album singles
"Na vrhu"	2019	—	Non-album singles
"Šampioni"	2019	—	Non-album singles
"Na frišno"	2020	16.	Non-album singles
"Ko bo to za nama"	2020	14.	Non-album singles
"Budala"	2020	—	Non-album singles
"Lučke"	2021	—	
"Raketa"	2022	—	
"Denarnica"	2022	—	
"Zate vse"	2023	—	
"Maj"	2023	—	
"Zadnjič pleševa"	2024	—	
"Ona zna"	2024	—	
"—" denotes a single that did not chart or was not released.

==== As featured artist ====
Title	Year	Peak chart positions	Album
Title	Year	SLO	Album
"It's Complicated" (Maraaya featuring BQL)	2017	9	Non-album singles
"Sjaj" (Maraaya featuring BQL)	2017	—	CMC Vodice 2017
"Vroče" (S.I.T. — Zorjan, Palma, Sešek, Jazbec...)	2018	5	Non-album singles
"—" denotes a single that did not chart or was not released.

== Other charted songs ==
=== As featured artist ===
Title	Year	Peak chart positions	Album
Title	Year	SLO	Album
"White Christmas / Bel božič" (Maraaya & BQL & Nika Zorjan & Manca Špik & Luka Basi & Klara Jazbec & Ula)	2017	31	Non-album singles
not released as a single, but did chart in some countries.
