= Here for You (Maraaya song) =

Song by Slovene duo Maraaya

Single by Maraaya
- Released: 28 February 2015 (premiere); 17 March 2015 (iTunes); 3 April 2015 (Italy)
- Genre: Indie; Pop
- Length: 3:24
- Label: Dance and Love
- Composer(s): Raay; Marjetka Vovk
- Lyricist(s): Raay; Charlie Mason
- Producer(s): Raay

Maraaya singles chronology
"Lovin' Me" (2014)	"Here for You" (2015)	"Living Again" (2015)

Eurovision Song Contest 2015 entry
- Country: Slovenia
- Artist(s): Aleš "Raay" Vovk; Marjetka Vovk
- As: Maraaya
- Language: English
- Composer(s): Raay; Marjetka Vovk
- Lyricist(s): Raay; Charlie Mason

Finals performance
- Semi-final result: 5th
- Semi-final points: 92
- Final result: 14th
- Final points: 39

Entry chronology
- ◄ "Round and Round" (2014)
- "Blue and Red" (2016) ►

Music video
- "Here for You" on YouTube

"Here for You" is a song by Slovene duo Maraaya. It was written by Raay, Marjetka Vovk and Charlie Mason. This is their second single released on 28 February 2015 at the Slovenia in the Eurovision Song Contest 2015 final night. The song represented Slovenia in the Eurovision Song Contest 2015.

== Success ==
They represented Slovenia in the Eurovision Song Contest 2015 with their second single "Here for You". They performed in the second semi final where the song gathered 92 points and earned 5th place. In the grand final the song received 39 points and was 14th.

Peak positions at the official singles charts: it was ranked on 1st place at the Slovenian SloTop50 chart, on 23rd at the Austrian Ö3 Austria Top 40 chart, on 24th at the Slovakian Rádio Top 100 chart, on 48th at the Belgian (Flanders) Ultratip 100 chart, on 10th at the Swedish Sverigetopplistan Heatseekers chart and on 18th at the Finnish Suomen virallinen lista digital chart. This song was top peak position at the German Hitfire singles chart.

== Formats and track listing ==
- Slovenia" CD Maxi promo single
1. "Here for You" (Radio Edit) – 3:24
2. "Here for You" (Tomec & Grabber Guitar Alternative) – 3:58
3. "Here for You" (Rasmus Vienna Remix) – 4:06
4. "Here for You" (featuring Perpetuum Jazzie) – 3:00
5. "Here for You" (Maraaya & Popsing) – 4:06
6. "Here for You" (Instrumental) – 4:06
7. "Here for You" (Rasmus Vienna Remix Instrumental) – 4:06
8. "Here for You" (3 Min Esc Version) – 2:59
9. "Here for You" (Esc Karaoke + Key Intro) – 3:03
10. "Lovin' Me" (Radio Edit) – 3:49

== Personnel ==
=== Main ===
- Raay - music, lyrics, arrangement, producer
- Marjetka Vovk - music, lead vocal
- Charlie Mason - lyrics
- Art Hunter - arrangement
- Tomass Snare - arrangement

=== Others ===
- Manca Špik - backing vocals
- Nika Zorjan - backing vocals
- Karin Zemljič - backing vocals
- Lara Balodis Slekovec - air violin

== Charts ==
=== Weekly charts ===
Chart (2015)	Peak position
Austria (Ö3 Austria Top 40)	23
Belgium (Ultratip Bubbling Under Flanders)	48
Finland (Suomen virallinen latauslista digital)	18
Slovakia (Rádio Top 100)	24
Slovenia (SloTop50)	1
Sweden Heatseekers (Sverigetopplistan)	10

Chart (2016)	Peak position
Slovenia (SloTop50)	10

=== Year-end charts ===
Chart (2015)	Peak position
Slovenia (SloTop50)	2

Chart (2016)	Peak position
Slovenia (SloTop50)	18

== Release history ==
Region	Date	Format	Label
Slovenia	28 February 2015	EMA 2015 (premiere)	Dance and Love
Worldwide	17 March 2015	Digital download (iTunes)	Dance and Love
Italy	3 April 2015	Digital download	Dance and Love
