= Living Again =

Single by Maraaya
- Released: 19 September 2015 (premiere); 13 June 2016 (Italy)
- Genre: Indie; pop
- Length: 3:20
- Label: Dance and Love Srl.
- Producer(s): Raay

Maraaya singles chronology
"Here for You" (2015)	"Living Again" (2015)	"Nothing Left for Me" (2016)

Music video
- "Living again" on YouTube

"Living Again" is a song by Slovene duo Maraaya. This is their third single released on 19 September 2015 at Red Cross live charity concert in Cankar Hall, Ljubljana.

== Credits and personnel ==
- Raay – music, producer
- Marjetka Vovk – lyrics, vocals
- Niko Karo, Karo Media – director of video

== Charts ==
=== Weekly charts ===
Chart (2015)	Peak position
Slovenia (SloTop50)	12

Chart (2016)	Peak position
Slovenia (SloTop50)	15

=== Year-end charts ===
Chart (2016)	Peak position
Slovenia (SloTop50)	49

== Release history ==
Region	Date	Format	Label
Slovenia	19 September 2015	Ljubljana Red Cross charity (premiere)	Dance and Love
Music video	5 October 2015	YouTube official video	Dance and Love
Italy / Worldwide	13 June 2016	Digital download (iTunes)	Dance and Love
