= Charlie Mason (lyricist) =

American lyricist

- Born: New Orleans, United States
- Occupation: Lyricist

Charlie Mason is an American lyricist whose credits include releases by Miley Cyrus, Girls' Generation, Eric Saade, Abraham Mateo, BoA, Ross Lynch, Monrose, Sergey Lazarev, Sweet California, Danny Saucedo, Sarah Connor, Robin Beck and Queensberry.

== Eurovision work ==
Mason co-wrote the Eurovision Song Contest 2014-winning song "Rise Like a Phoenix", sung by Austrian artist Conchita Wurst, as well as the Slovenia's entry for the Eurovision Song Contest 2015, Here for You, sung by Maraaya and the English version of Serbia's entry in the Eurovision Song Contest 2015, "Beauty Never Lies", sung by Bojana Stamenov. In 2016, he wrote "Half a Smile", sung by Vincent Gross, a song in the 2016 Switzerland selection for Eurovision.

== Early career ==
Mason got his start as a lyricist working with German vocalist-musician Dirk Homuth on songs for an alt-pop group which Homuth named Almost Charlie so that, although his friend is "unable to play any instrument more complicated than a toaster", he could still be represented in some way. To date, the act has released five albums, "Loving Counterclockwise" (2006), "The Plural of Yes" (2009), "Tomorrow's Yesterday" (2012), "A Different Kind of Here" (2017) and "A Whisper in a World Too Loud" (2022).

Since then, Mason has written lyrics in nearly every genre, for artists including House of Lords, Gigi Radics, Oscar Zia, Ashley Tisdale, Andrey Tikhonov, Electrovamp, Jonathan Fagerlund, Jane Badler and Miss Coco Peru. His personal projects have included albums by Kim David Smith and Amelia's Fault, and singles by Nathalie Archangel and former Vanity 6 and Apollonia 6 member Brenda Bennett.

== Entries in the Eurovision Song Contest ==
- "L'amore è femmina" by Nina Zilli, Italy, (Eurovision Song Contest 2012), 9th place
- "Rise Like a Phoenix" by Conchita Wurst, Austria, (Eurovision Song Contest 2014), 1st place
- "Beauty Never Lies" by Bojana Stamenov, Serbia, (Eurovision Song Contest 2015), 10th place
- "Here for You" by Maraaya, Slovenia, (Eurovision Song Contest 2015), 14th place
- "The Dream" by Roko, Croatia, (Eurovision Song Contest 2019), 14th place (Semi-final 2)
- "Heartbeat" by Petar Aničić, Serbia, (Junior Eurovision Song Contest 2020), 11th place
- "Amen" by Ana Soklič, Slovenia, (Eurovision Song Contest 2021), 13th place (Semi-final 1)
