= Dan D =

Slovenian rock band

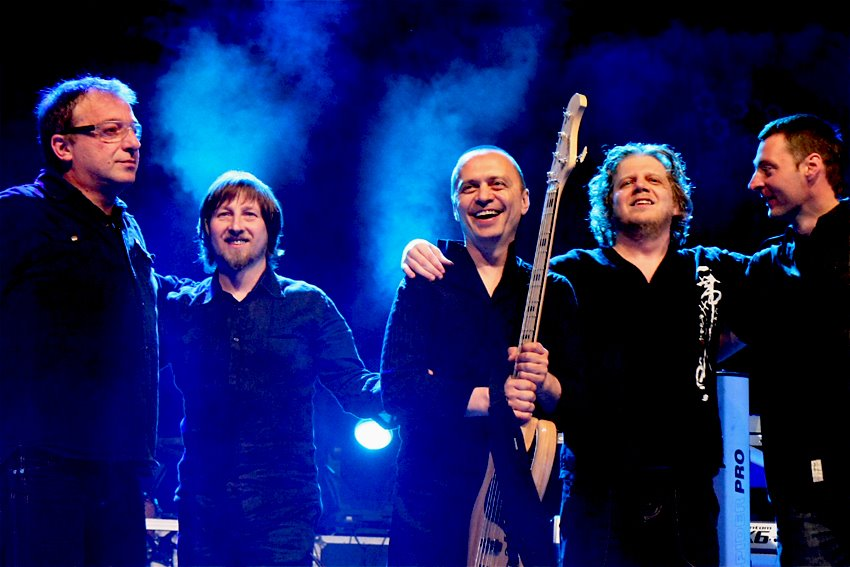

Background information
- Origin: Novo Mesto, Slovenia
- Genres: Rock and roll
- Years active: 1996–2025
- Labels: ZKP RTVSlo; Menart Records; Kif Kif
- Members: Tomislav Jovanovič; Dušan Obradinovič; Marko Turk; Nikola Sekulovič; Boštjan Grubar
- Past members: Primož Špelko; Aleš Bartelj
- Website: dan-d.net/

Dan D (meaning D-Day in Slovene) was a Slovenian rock band, formed in 1996 in Novo Mesto. They released seven studio albums before separating on December 31, 2025.

== Band members ==
The group was formed from the remnants of the Mercedes Band musical ensemble by the singer Tomislav Jovanovič (nicknamed Tokac) and the drummer Dušan Obradinovič (nicknamed Obra) who later invited his friend Marko Turk (Tučo) as the rhythm guitar, Primož Špelko as the bass guitar, and Aleš Bartelj as the solo guitar. After Primož Špelko and Aleš Bartelj left, the band invited the bass guitarist Andrej Zupančič and the keyboardist Boštjan Grubar, and Tokac started to also play guitar. In 2006, Andrej Zupančič was replaced by Nikola Sekulovič as the bass guitarist.

== Performances ==
In March 2007, Dan D and the Siddharta band performed at the presentation of the Slovenian media award Viktor in the Cankar Hall in Ljubljana the joint version of the Dan D's Voda and the Siddharta's song Male roke. This version later became one of the biggest hits of the year in Slovenia. The next day the two groups were presented in the TV show Tistega lepega popoldneva, broadcast by TV Slovenija, the Slovenian national TV station.

On 13 September and 14 September 2009, the band performed in Križanke, a performance place in Ljubljana, alongside the RTV Slovenia Symphony Orchestra. The concert was broadcast by TV Slovenija as well as by Val 202, the Slovenian national radio station.

== Discography ==
- 1997: Igra
- 1999: Ko hodiš nad oblaki
- 2004: Katere barve je tvoj dan
- 2009: Ure letenja za ekstravagantne ptice
- 2009: Dan 202 (live CD/DVD)
- 2012: Poleno (limited edition music cassette)
- 2013: Tiho (live acoustic CD)
- 2015: DNA D
- 2018: Milo za drago (limited edition, special issue)
- 2019: Knjiga pohval in pritožb
- 2025: Rabim človeka
