= Neisha =

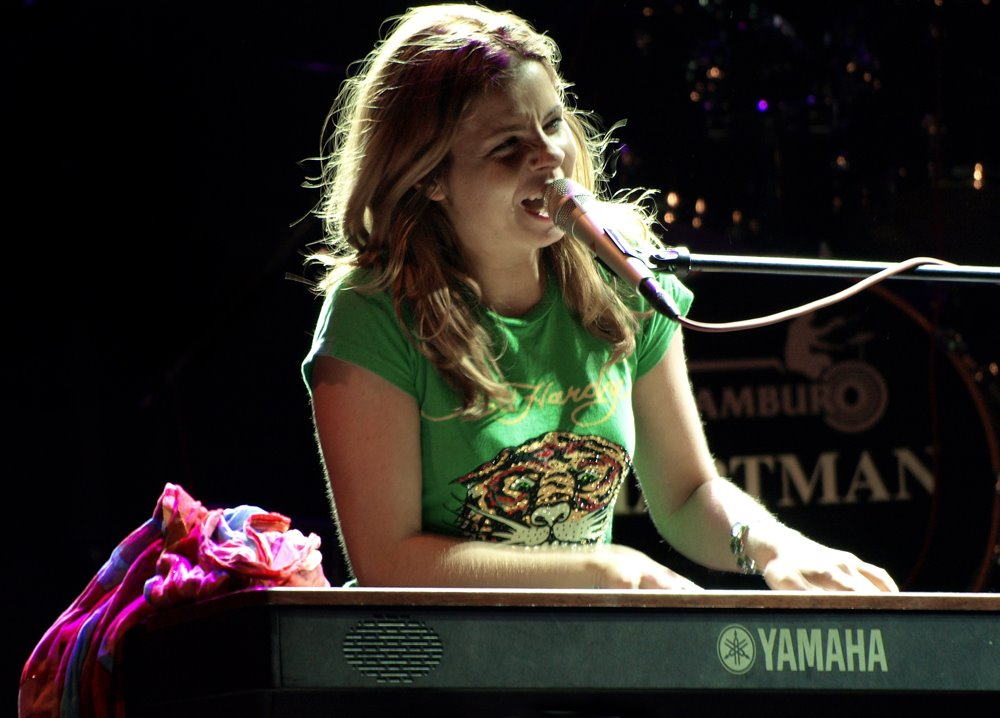
Neisha in 2008

Neža Buh (born 5 January 1982), known professionally as Neisha, is a Slovenian pianist and pop singer.

Being born into a music family, Neža's music talent was noticed during her childhood. Hence, she entered a music school (first in Cerkno, then in Škofja Loka) and continued at the Ljubljana Music and Ballet High School. As she was very successful at several contests in piano music and solfeggio, the school awarded her the Škerjanc Award in 2003. In 2000, she became a student of the Music Academy in Ljubljana.

Besides classical music she collaborated with many commercial pop and rock artists (among others Terrafolk, and Big Foot Mama) as an arranger, backup vocalist or keyboard player etc. Her solo career started in 2005. Her first single, Planet za zadet (the English version of this song was titled Straight to the Moon), was very well received among radio audiences. Due to great interest her first album, simply named Neisha, was released two weeks earlier than initially planned. During its first week, only a turbo folk band Atomik Harmonik sold more albums but by the end of the year Neisha became Slovenian best sold album of 2005 although it was released in autumn. After 10 weeks of reigning the national record chart, many awards and several sold out concerts it was the best sold album of 2006 in Slovenia as well.

In 2007, Neisha released album, called Nor je ta svet (translated as This world is crazy), which was also quite successful. With her new album, Neisha continued performing in major Slovenian concert venues including such as Križanke and Cankarjev dom. She cooperated with regional big names starting with Kornelije Kovač, Vlado Kreslin, Gibonni, Massimo, Vlatko Stefanovski etc.

The year 2010 saw the release of Neisha's newest studio album named Krila (translated as Wings). On this album she continued working with her longtime producer Dejan Radičević. The result was an album which sounded different from anything that Neisha did before. Songs are livelier, faster more intense.

== Discography ==
- Neisha: 2005. Nika records, producer Dejan Radičević
- Nor je ta svet: 2007 Nika records, producer Dejan Radičević
- Miles away (English compilation): 2009. Dallas, producer Dejan Radičević
- Krila: 2010. Nika records, producer: Dejan Radičević
