= Alya (singer) =

Slovenian pop singer

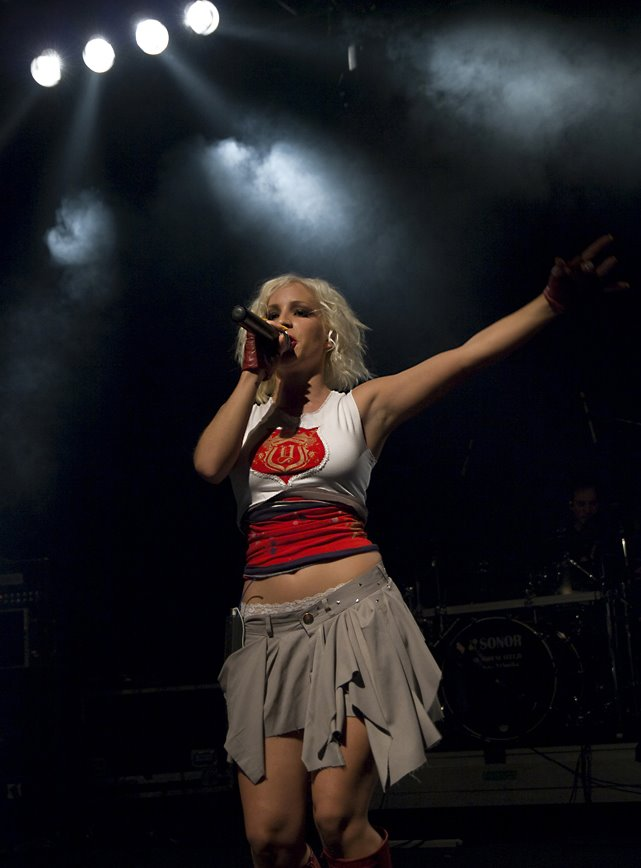

Background information
- Born: Alja Omladič; 28 May 1983 (age 43); Mozirje, SR Slovenia, SFR Yugoslavia
- Genres: Pop
- Occupation: Singer
- Instrument: Vocals
- Years active: 2001–present

Alya (born Alja Omladič, May 28, 1983, Mozirje, SFR Yugoslavia) is a Slovenian pop singer.

== Career ==
Alya's connections to music goes far in her childhood. She started singing quite early and as a little girl she also played piano. Later on, she invited four boys to found her own quality band. One of her first performances was the radio Hit festival in 2001 with the song "Mr. Pozelenja" which brought her 2nd place. After that she made a boom on different radio music charts, especially with her next song "Igra" which had a premiere in the Slovenian Supermodel show 2002. All of the time she had lot of concerts in clubs and events. She also participated in the Slovenian Eurosong Contests (EMA) and hit the top of Slovenian charts.
Her first CD album Alya was published by Menart Records Label and was released in April 2004. The album was published in gold and also in platinum edition. Videos for Alya and Zvezda vecera, were also very successful abroad and climbed the charts on MTV (World Chart Express). Her song "Fluid" won the award for the best rock song in Slovenia for the year 2004 on the S.R.F. (Slovenian Radio Festival). In the year 2004 she won the title Slovenian musician with the best style (The statue of Modna Jana). The readers of the magazine FHM (For Him Magazine) marked Alya as one of the sexiest women in the world. In addition to this, the research of one of the Slovenian biggest Internet search engine (Najdi.si) showed that she is one of the most wanted Slovenian artists on the web. Slovenian journalists chose her for Singer of the Year 2005. She was the advertising face of the year for Wrigley and in the year 2006 she also made a promotion for Slovenian biggest mobile provider - Mobitel.

== Singles and most popular songs ==
She recorded a hit song "A veš" which was written by Jan Plestenjak and it was voted for the best song of the year 2008 and made a new hip-hop version with a guest 6Pack Cukur. She also recorded a song for reality show Big Brother Slovenia 2008, called "Zelo naglas" (Very Loud in English). In May 2009 she released a new album Non Stop!, mainly produced in Horus Sound Studio in Hannover, and supported by guitar parts from Henning Rumenapp (Guano Apes).

Single "Brazil" from album Non Stop! is a most popular song in her country.
There are also more hit songs between 2010 and 2014:

- Moja pesem (Slovenian Hit song of 2012)
- Zlaži se mi (Slovenian Hit and the most played / aired / broadcast song of 2013)
- Car (Single for a Slovenian mobile provider brand - MINGL)

== In popular culture ==
In 2014 Alya became 'the face' of a mobile provider brand MINGL, for which she recorded a single "Car". The song was presented on the big historical event called Concert in the Sky, provided by MINGL and Croatia Airlines - concert above the clouds, on the 4500 ft in the Airbus A319.

== Discography ==
=== Albums ===
- Alya (2004)
- Non Stop (2009)
- Car (2014)

=== Singles ===
- Fluid (2004)
- Alya (2004)
- Omama (2004)
- Exxtra (2005)
- Zvezda Večera (2005)
- Občutek / Občutek (Dee jay Time By Dr. Silvano DJ Remix) (2005)
- Vizija (2007)
- A Veš (2007)
- Zelo Naglas (2008)
- Absolutely Moj (2008)
- Zadnji Dan (ft. Rudi Bučar) (2009)
- Brazil (2010)
- Non Stop! (2010)
- Tu In Zdaj (2010)
- Vse bo vredu (2011)
- Moja pesem (2012)
- Zlaži se mi (2013)
- Car (2014)
- Misunderstandings (ft. Neno Belan) (2014.) (EMA 2014.)
- Jedan Život Duže (2022.) (CMC Festival)

=== Video ===
- Alya (2004)
- Zvezda Večera (2005)
- A Veš (2007)
- Zadnji Dan (2009)
- Brazil (2010)
- Tu In Zdaj / Say Goodbye (2010)
- Moja pesem (2012)
- Car (2014)
