= Nina Pušlar =

Slovenian singer-songwriter (born 1988)

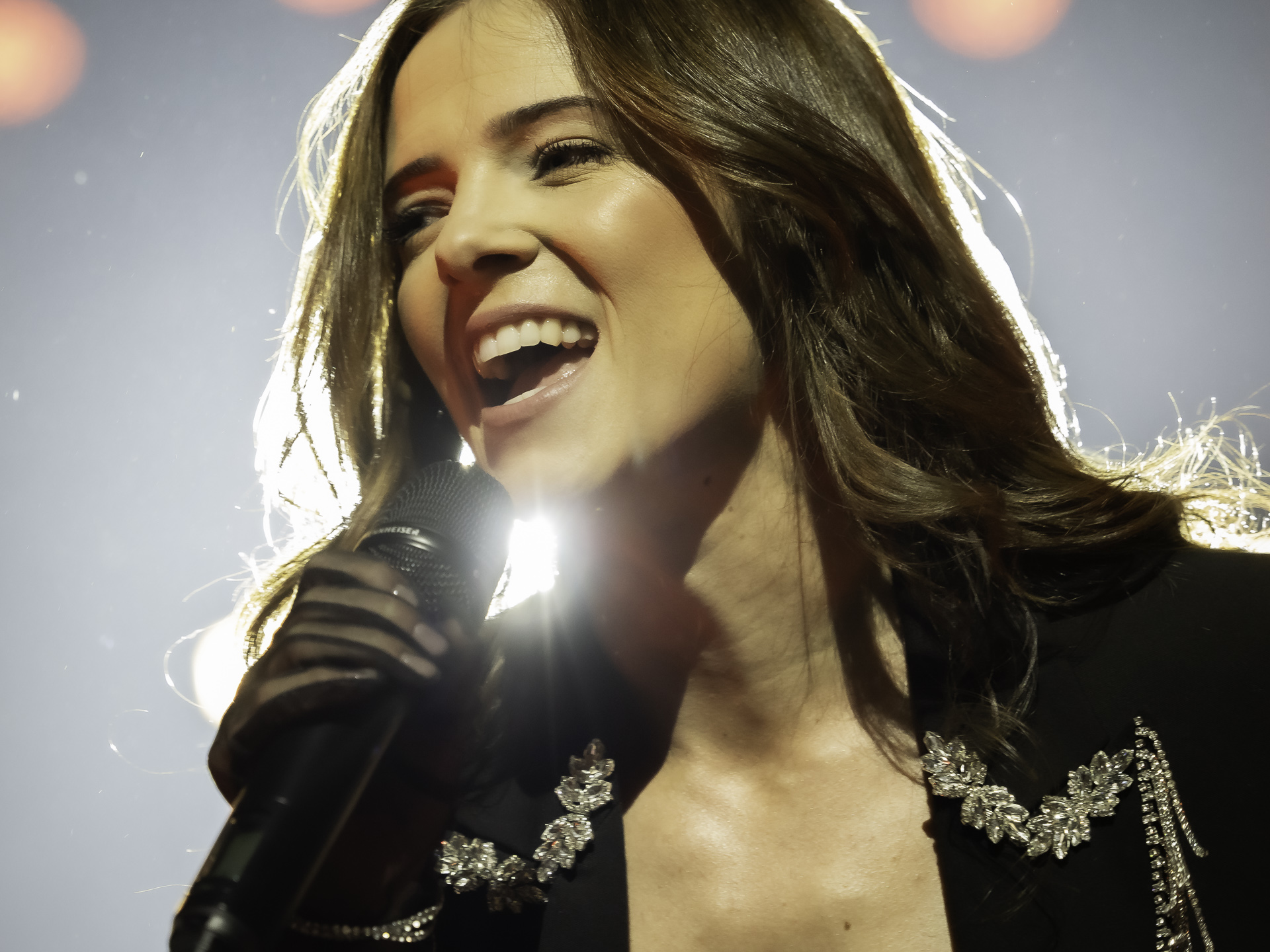
- Nina in Stožice, 2023

Background information
- Birth name: Nina Pušlar
- Born: October 25, 1988 (age 36)
- Origin: Ivančna Gorica, Slovenia
- Genres: Pop, rock
- Occupation: Singer-songwriter
- Instrument: Vocals
- Years active: 2005–present
- Website: ninapuslar.com

Nina Pušlar (born October 25, 1988, in Ivančna Gorica, Slovenia) is a Slovenian singer-songwriter.

== Biography ==
She won the contest Bitke talentov 2005 and released her debut album Nina Pušlar in 2006. She participated in Slovenian National Selection, EMA 2010 with the song "Dež", she reached second place in the final, but could not represent Slovenia in the Eurovision Song Contest. After the contest, she released her second album, Slečeno srce. She also participated in EMA 2011 with the song "Bilo lepo bi", but she could not qualify through to the final. Then she released her third album, Med vrsticami. In 2012, she participated in show "Slovenska popevka 2012" and reached second place with the song "Kdo še verjame". In 2013, she released her fourth album, Nekje vmes.

== Discography ==
=== Studio albums ===
- Nina Pušlar (2006)
- Slečeno srce (2010)
- Med vrsticami (2011)
- Nekje vmes (2013)
- #malodrugace (2015)
- Nina (2019)
- Nina, Nina, Nina (2022)
