= Maraaya =

Slovenian musical duo

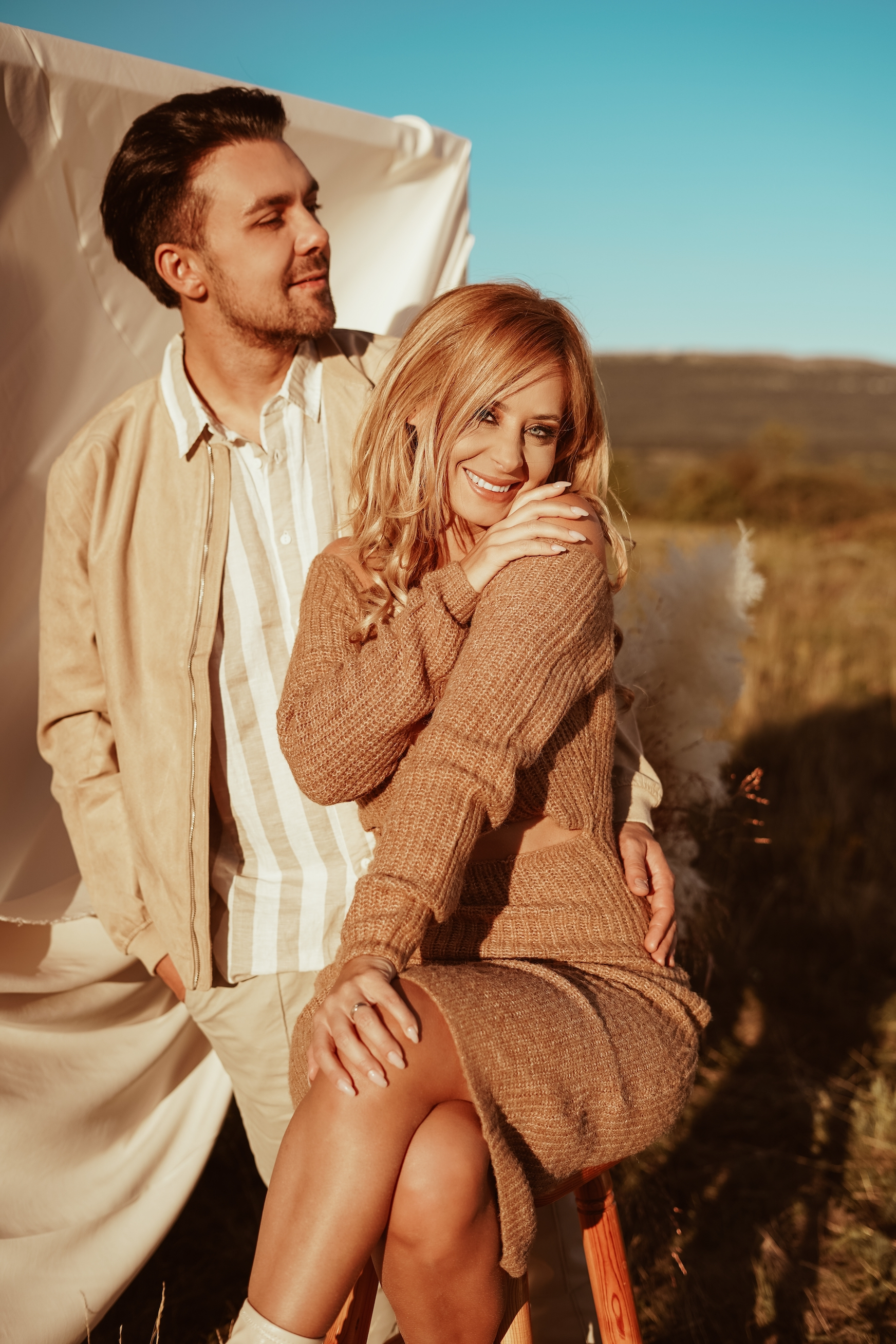
- Maraaya in 2022

Background information
- Origin: Ljubljana, Slovenia
- Genres: Indie pop; neo-soul; R&B; pop; dance
- Years active: 2014–present
- Labels: Dance and Love; BIP Records; Nika Records; Warner Music
- Members: Aleš Vovk (Raay); Marjetka Vovk
- Website: maraaya.com

Maraaya are a Slovenian duo founded by Marjetka Vovk and Aleš Vovk (Raay) in 2014. The group's name is a combination of its members' names, while its pronunciation means "She has Raay" in Slovene.

Raay is credited as co-writer and producer for many Slovenian artists. He is credited as the composer on Slovenia's 2014 Eurovision song "Round and Round", and they both contributed to Slovenia's 2014 Junior Eurovision song with "Nisi sam (Your Light)" and 2015 Junior Eurovision song with "Prva ljubezen" (The First Love). In 2013 Raay co-wrote and produced the music for "My Way Is My Decision", a hit song performed by Slovenian alpine skier Tina Maze. Raay co-wrote, produced and recorded first two singles ("Muza" and "Heart of Gold") for BQL, a Slovenian brothers duo.

In September 2017 they signed a contract with Warner Music Group and became the first Slovenian artists to sign with Warner Music.

After BQL, they are the second Slovenian artist to reach the top position on the national official singles charts SloTop50, with at least two singles: "Here for You" and "Diamond Duck".

== Career ==
=== 2014: First single ===
The duo of producer Raay (real name: Aleš Vovk) and vocalist Marjetka Vovk (née Jurkovnik), both previously members of the turbo-folk group Turbo Angels, was formed in 2014 when they released their first single "Lovin' Me". This song was among the top 20 most selling singles in Italy and a big success at iTunes music charts in Belgium, Germany, Italy and Slovenia.

It was also listed on the Polish "Bravo Hits Zima 2015" compilation. This song was among the top ten selling singles in Italy and was ranked at 34th place in the German DJ's Dance Top 100 singles chart.

"Lovin' Me" charted in many countries' official singles charts: it was ranked in 13th place in the Slovenian SloTop50 chart, in 52nd in the Italian FIMI chart and in 83rd in the Belgian (Flanders) Ultratip 100 chart.

=== 2015: Eurovision ===
#1 in Slovenia (SloTop50)
- 2015 - "Here for You"
- 2017 - "Diamond Duck"

They represented Slovenia in the Eurovision Song Contest 2015 with their second single "Here for You". They performed in the second semi final where the song gathered 92 points and earned 5th place. In the grand final the song received 39 points and came 14th.

Like "Lovin' Me", "Here For You" charted in many countries' official singles charts: it topped the Slovenian SloTop50 chart, it charted at 23rd in the Austrian Ö3 Austria Top 40 chart, at 24th in the Slovak Rádio Top 100 chart, at 48th in the Belgian (Flanders) Ultratip 100 chart, at 10th in the Swedish Sverigetopplistan Heatseekers chart and at 18th in the Finnish Suomen virallinen lista digital chart. This song also topped the German Hitfire singles chart.

In September 2015 they presented and released their third single "Living Again" at the Red Cross live charity concert in Cankar Hall, Ljubljana. It charted at 12th place in the official Slovenian singles SloTop50 chart, without any international success.

=== 2016: Fourth single ===
They presented and released their fourth single "Nothing Left for Me" as special guests at the Slovenia in the Eurovision Song Contest 2016. It charted at 18th place in the official Slovenian singles SloTop50 chart, without any international success.

=== 2017: Fifth single ft. BQL ===
On 26 May 2017, Maraaya featuring BQL premiered their fifth single "It's Complicated" and the video for the song at the same time on Cankar Street in Ljubljana. This single was officially released on 7 June 2017 and a Croatian version was released two days later.

On 22 September 2017, Maraaya released their sixth single "Diamond Duck" for the worldwide market with help of Warner Music. In Slovenia, the song was officially released on 2 October 2017. The song made its SloTop50 debut and peaked the chart immediately.

=== 2026: San Marino Song contest ===
In 2026, the band participated in San Marino's national selection for Eurovision «San Marino Song Contest» with the song "Alu Alu." Maraaya failed to qualify to the final.

== Personal life ==
Raay and Marjetka are a married couple and have two sons, named Vid and Oskar. They have a private music school searching for and teaching young talented singers and musicians.

Awards and achievements
Preceded by Tinkara Kovač with "Round and Round"	Slovenia in the Eurovision Song Contest; 2015	Succeeded by ManuElla with "Blue and Red"
