= SloTop50 =

Weekly, monthly and yearly updated list of top 50 singles on Slovenian radio stations

- Industry: Music
- Founded: 6 January 2013
- Founder: SAZAS
- Headquarters: Trzin, Slovenia
- Products: official national singles charts (weekly, monthly, yearly)
- Website: slotop50.si

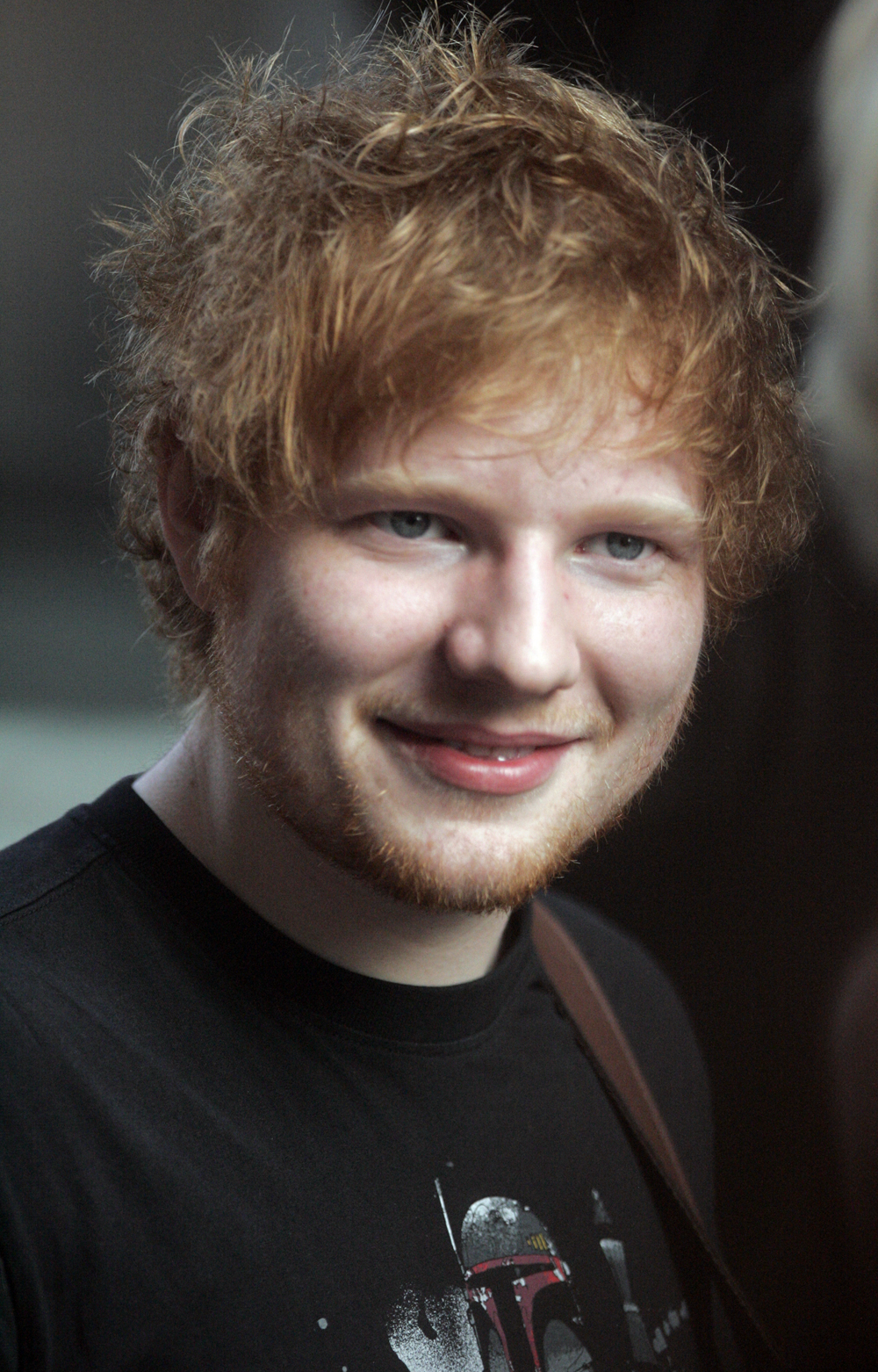
Ed Sheeran holds the chart record: by total weeks at number one (41); for most singles at number one (5)

SloTop50 is the official Slovenian singles chart provider established by SAZAS (The association of composers and authors for protection of copyright of Slovenia) in 2013. It presents weekly, monthly and yearly singles charts, following 61 various radio stations across Slovenia. It publishes weekly charts once a week, every Sunday. Chart contain data generated by the SloTop50 system according to any song played during the period starting the previous Monday morning at time 00:00:00 and ending Sunday night at 23:59:59.

The first number one song of the SloTop50 was "Srečno novo leto" by Rok 'n' Band, on 6 January 2013. As of the issue for the week ending on 20 June 2021, the SloTop50 has had 90 different number one hits in total of 442 weeks.

== History ==
From 1997 to 2012 year-end singles chart existed for Slovenian artists only. Sazas measured songs that were most played on Slovenian radio stations. That was a different kind of measuring, no weekly charts, just the total number of repeats at the end of the year. In 2013 a new technology by international standards was introduced, measuring both Slovenian and international music with weekly singles charts.

== Charts published ==
Presently three charts are published:

- SloTop50 Singles - weekly
- SloTop50 Singles - monthly
- SloTop50 Singles - yearly

== Song of the year ==
In three categories: year-end number-one song, year-end best charted domestic song and number-one (pre)xmas week song.

Year	Number-one		Domestic song		Xmas week	
2013	"Wake Me Up"	Avicii ft. Aloe Blacc	"Nasmeh življenja"	Nika Zorjan	"Hey Brother"	Avicii
2014	"Jubel"	Klingande	"Spet"	Tinkara Kovač	"All About That Bass"	Meghan Trainor
2015	"Love Me Like You Do"	Ellie Goulding	"Here for You"	Maraaya	"Hello"	Adele
2016	"Photograph"	Ed Sheeran	"To mi je všeč"	Nina Pušlar	"Driving Home for Christmas"	Chris Rea
2017	"Shape of You"	Ed Sheeran	"Heart of Gold"	BQL	"Last Christmas"	Wham!
2018	"Perfect"	Ed Sheeran	"Srce za srce"	Alya	"In My Mind"	Dynoro ft. Gigi D'Agostino
2019	"Sweet but Psycho"	Ava Max	Vroče	S.I.T.	"Dance Monkey"	Tones and I
2020	"Blinding Lights"	The Weeknd	"Svet na dlani"	Nina Pušlar	"Last Christmas"	Wham!

== SloTop50 statistics ==
After 442 weeks since chart was established (updated: 20 June 2021)

=== All songs reaching No.1 ===
All songs reaching top chart #1 position in chronological order
#	Song	Artist	Weeks
1	"Srečno novo leto"	(Slovenia) Rok'n'Band	1
2	"Krila"	(Slovenia) Neisha	2
3	"Stronger (What Doesn't Kill You)"	(United States) Kelly Clarkson	3
4	"To je moj dan"	(Slovenia) Kataya	1
5	"People Help the People"	(United Kingdom) Birdy	14
6	"Hollywood Hills"	(Finland) Sunrise Avenue	1
7	"Hvala za vijolice"	(Slovenia) Bilbi	2
8	"Pumped Up Kicks"	(United States) Foster the People	3
9	"Get Lucky"	(France) (United States) Daft Punk featuring Pharrell Williams	4
10	"Wake Me Up"	(Sweden) (United States) Avicii featuring Aloe Blacc	12
11	"Roar"	(United States) Katy Perry	2
12	"Bonfire Heart"	(United Kingdom) James Blunt	5
13	"Hey Brother"	(Sweden) Avicii	3
14	"Timber"	(United States) Pitbull featuring Kesha	8
15	"Stolen Dance"	(Germany) Milky Chance	2
16	"Spet"	(Slovenia) Tinkara Kovač	3
17	"Happy"	(United States) Pharrell Williams	3
18	"Addicted to You"	(Sweden) Avicii	2
19	"Waves"	(Netherlands) Mr. Probz	1
20	"Budapest"	(United Kingdom) George Ezra	12
21	"Summer"	(United Kingdom) Calvin Harris	4
22	"Prayer in C"	(France) (Germany) Lilly Wood and the Prick and Robin Schulz	8
23	"Rude"	(Canada) Magic!	1
24	"All of Me"	(United States) John Legend	1
25	"All About That Bass"	(United States) Meghan Trainor	16
26	"Love Me Like You Do"	(United Kingdom) Ellie Goulding	6
27	"Here for You"	(Slovenia) Maraaya	7
28	"Cheerleader"	(Jamaica) OMI	14
29	"Ain't Nobody (Loves Me Better)"	(Germany) (United Kingdom) Felix Jaehn featuring Jasmine Thompson	1
30	"Sugar"	(Germany) (Canada) Robin Schulz featuring Francesco Yates	2
31	"Photograph"	(United Kingdom) Ed Sheeran	2
32	"Reality"	(Belgium) (Netherlands) Lost Frequencies featuring Janieck Devy	4
33	"Hello"	(United Kingdom) Adele	15
34	"Book of Love"	(Germany) (United States) Felix Jaehn featuring Polina	1
35	"Adventure of a Lifetime"	(United Kingdom) Coldplay	2
36	"Stitches"	(Canada) Shawn Mendes	3
37	"Love Yourself"	(Canada) Justin Bieber	4
38	"7 Years"	(Denmark) Lukas Graham	1
39	"Blue and Red"	(Slovenia) ManuElla	1
40	"Cheap Thrills"	(Australia) Sia	2
41	"Can't Stop the Feeling!"	(United States) Justin Timberlake	7
42	"Srce za srce"	(Slovenia) Alya	9
43	"Muza"	(Slovenia) BQL	1
44	"Duele el Corazón"	(Spain) (Puerto Rico) Enrique Iglesias featuring Wisin	3
45	"Treat You Better"	(Canada) Shawn Mendes	3
46	"Don't Be So Shy"	(France) Imany	2
47	"The Greatest"	(Australia) (United States) Sia featuring Kendrick Lamar	1
48	"Lost on You"	(United States) LP	3
49	"Human"	(United Kingdom) Rag'n'Bone Man	3
50	"All I Want for Christmas Is You"	(United States) Mariah Carey	1
51	"Driving Home for Christmas"	(United Kingdom) Chris Rea	1
52	"Love My Life"	(United Kingdom) Robbie Williams	4
53	"Rockabye"	(United Kingdom) (Jamaica) Clean Bandit featuring Sean Paul and Anne-Marie	1
54	"Heart of Gold"	(Slovenia) BQL	4
55	"Shape of You"	(United Kingdom) Ed Sheeran	11
56	"Despacito"	(Puerto Rico) Luis Fonsi featuring Daddy Yankee	3
57	"Súbeme la Radio"	(Spain) (Cuba) (Puerto Rico) Enrique Iglesias featuring Descemer Bueno and Zion & Lennox	4
58	"Galway Girl"	(United Kingdom) Ed Sheeran	10
59	"Diamond Duck"	(Slovenia) Maraaya	2
60	"What About Us"	(United States) Pink	3
61	"Perfect"	(United Kingdom) Ed Sheeran	15
62	"Havana"	(Cuba) (United States) Camila Cabello featuring Young Thug	2
63	"Last Christmas"	(United Kingdom) Wham!	2
64	"Échame la Culpa"	(Puerto Rico) (United States) Luis Fonsi and Demi Lovato	8
65	"Say Something"	(United States) Justin Timberlake featuring Chris Stapleton	1
66	"These Days"	(United Kingdom) (United States) Rudimental featuring Jess Glynne, Macklemore, and Dan Caplen	2
67	"Flames"	(France) (Australia) David Guetta and Sia	3
68	"One Kiss"	(United Kingdom) Calvin Harris and Dua Lipa	11
69	"La Cintura"	(Spain) Álvaro Soler	2
70	"Solo"	(United Kingdom) (United States) Clean Bandit featuring Demi Lovato	2
71	"Promises"	(United Kingdom) Calvin Harris ft. Sam Smith	11
72	"In My Mind"	(Lithuania) (Italy) Dynoro ft. Gigi D'Agostino	7
73	"Sweet but Psycho"	(United States) Ava Max	10
74	"Nothing Breaks Like a Heart"	(United Kingdom) (United States) Mark Ronson feat. Miley Cyrus	1
75	"Giant"	(United Kingdom) Calvin Harris and Rag'n'Bone Man	3
76	"Con Calma"	(Puerto Rico) (Canada) Daddy Yankee feat. Snow	11
77	"I Don't Care"	(United Kingdom) (Canada) Ed Sheeran and Justin Bieber	3
78	"Señorita"	(Canada) (Cuba) (United States) Shawn Mendes and Camila Cabello	17
79	"Dance Monkey"	(Australia) Tones and I	6
80	"Memories"	(United States) Maroon 5	5
81	"Don't Start Now"	(United Kingdom) Dua Lipa	2
82	"Blinding Lights"	(Canada) The Weeknd	15
83	"Breaking Me"	(Sweden) (Germany) Topic and A7S	6
84	"Rain on Me"	(United States) Lady Gaga and Ariana Grande	3
85	"Savage Love (Laxed – Siren Beat)"	(New Zealand) (United States) Jawsh 685 and Jason Derulo	8
86	"Watermelon Sugar"	(United Kingdom) Harry Styles	3
87	"Kings & Queens"	(United States) Ava Max	2
88	"Head & Heart"	(United Kingdom) Joel Corry & MNEK	13
89	"Meni dobro je"	(Slovenia) Jan Plestenjak	1
90	"Save Your Tears"	(Canada) The Weeknd	14

=== Best charted domestic songs ===
Top Slovenian songs, no matter what chart position in chronological order
By order	Song	Artists	Total weeks
1	"Srečno novo leto"	Rok'n'Band	4
2	"Krila"	Neisha	2
3	"I'd Like To (My FB Song)"	April	4
4	"To je moj dan"	Kataya	4
5	"Dan brez tebe"	Victory	6
6	"Poljubljena"	Tabu	3
7	"Čas"	Dan D	1
8	"Zbudi se za prvi maj"	Mi2	1
9	"Dan ljubezni"	Pepel in kri	1
10	"Hvala za vijolice"	Bilbi	4
11	"Mars in Venera"	Tinkara Kovač	1
12	"Nasmeh življenja"	Nika Zorjan	14
13	"Čao lepa"	Jan Plestenjak	1
14	"Svet je tvoj!"	Nina Pušlar	1
15	"Zaljubljena"	Victory	1
16	"Nov dan"	Muff	11
17	"Pozitivne misli"	Dan D	4
18	"Spet"	Tinkara Kovač	25
19	"Po dežju"	Nika Zorjan	6
20	"Lovin' Me"	Maraaya	20
21	"Here for You"	Maraaya	34
22	"Nekaj med nama"	Iztok Easy Novak	4
23	"Carica"	Tanja Žagar	2
24	"Piknik"	Siddharta	1
25	"Ledena"	Siddharta	1
26	"Living Again"	Maraaya	5
27	"Najljubša napaka"	Anja Rupel	2
28	"Stara dobra"	Jan Plestenjak	6
29	"Prelepa za poraz"	Jan Plestenjak	2
30	"Blue and Red"	ManuElla	5
31	"To mi je všeč"	Nina Pušlar	8
32	"Srce za srce"	Alya	19
33	"Muza"	BQL	3
34	"Pesem"	Manca Špik & Kvartopirci	1
35	"Vrhovi"	Neisha	1
36	"Milijon in ena"	Klara Jazbec	8
37	"Oba"	Manca Špik & Isaac Palma	2
38	"Heart of Gold"	BQL	19
39	"Halo"	Alya	13
40	"Diamond Duck"	Maraaya	7
41	"Ni predaje, ni umika"	BQL & Nika Zorjan	11
42	"Spet te slišim"	Lamai	2
43	"Promise"	BQL	1
44	"Uspavanka-Lullaby"	Nika Zorjan	1
45	"Ptica"	BQL	8
46	"Hvala, ne!"	Lea Sirk	1
47	"Velik je ta svet"	Jan Plestenjak ft. Salle	5
48	"Dobro jutro življenje"	Alya	1
49	"Luna"	Nika Zorjan ft. J. Haller	18
50	"Vroče"	S.I.T.	4
51	"Povej mi, kaj bi rada"	Jan Plestenjak	2
52	"Za naju"	Nina Pušlar	1
53	"Peru"	BQL	11
54	"Sebi"	Zala Kralj & Gašper Šantl	8
55	"V srce"	Natalija Verboten	5
56	"Ola Ola"	Nika Zorjan & Isaac Palma	13
57	"Na plažo"	Nika Zorjan	2
58	"Čaša vina"	Natalija Verboten ft. Best	8
59	"Serenada"	Manca Špik	1
60	"Svet na dlani"	Nina Pušlar	13
61	"Bela snežinka"	Veter	2
62	"Beli oblaki, bele snežinke"	Poskočni muzikanti & Nuša Derenda	1
63	"Včeraj in za zmeraj"	Nina Pušlar	1
64	"Človek brez imena"	Jan Plestenjak	1
65	"Sreča"	Pop Design	2
66	"Nocoj"	Manca Špik	3
67	"Malo, malo"	Rebeka Dremelj	2
68	"Na frišno"	BQL	4
69	"Še zdaj ne vem zakaj"	Vili Resnik	2
70	"Nimam skrbi"	Sopranos	1
71	"Mojito"	Lara Kadis	9
72	"Ko bo to za nama"	BQL	2
73	"Obujem nove čevlje"	Maraaya	9
74	"Julija"	Boom!	1
75	"Drevo"	Maraaya	3
76	"Meni dobro je"	Jan Plestenjak	8
77	"Največ"	Klara Jazbec	6
78	"Medena"	Pop Design	3
79	"Dobr' gre"	Maraaya	2
80	"Ko si z mano"	Nino Ošlak	2
81	"Romeo in Julija 2021"	Flirt	4
82	"Imela sva vse"	Wolf	2
93	"Zgoraj je nebo"	Jan Plestenjak ft. Coto	1

=== Most weeks on No.1 ===
Rank	Song	Artists	Year	Weeks
1	"Señorita"	Shawn Mendes and Camila Cabello	2019	17
2	"All About That Bass"	Meghan Trainor	2014	16
3	"Perfect"	Ed Sheeran	2017/18	15
	"Hello"	Adele	2015	15
	"Blinding Lights"	The Weeknd	2020	15
6	"People Help The People"	Birdy	2013	14
	"Cheerleader"	OMI	2015	14
	"Save Your Tears"	The Weeknd	2020	14
9	"Head & Heart"	Joel Corry & MNEK	2021	13
10	"Budapest"	George Ezra	2014	12
	"Wake Me Up"	Avicii feat. Aloe Blacc	2013	12

=== Artists with most weeks on No.1 ===
Rank	Artists	Country	Weeks
1	Ed Sheeran	United Kingdom	41
2	Avicii	Sweden	17
3	Meghan Trainor	United States	16
	The Weeknd	Canada	16
4	Adele	United Kingdom	15
5	Birdy	United Kingdom	14
	OMI	Jamaica	14

=== Artists with most number 1's ===
Rank	Artists	Country	Songs
1	Ed Sheeran	United Kingdom	5
2	Calvin Harris	United Kingdom	4
3	Avicii	Sweden	3
4	Maraaya	Slovenia	2
	BQL	Slovenia	2
	Ava Max	United States	2
	Justin Timberlake	United States	2
	Pharrell Williams	United States	2
	Robin Schulz	Germany	2
	Felix Jaehn	Germany	2
	Shawn Mendes	Canada	2
	Justin Bieber	Canada	2
	The Weeknd	Canada	2
	Sia	Australia	2
	Luis Fonsi	Puerto Rico	2
	Enrique Iglesias	Spain	2

== Bum Award ==
SAZAS gives "SloTop50 Bum Award" only to domestic artists who hit the peak chart position in first week of airplay:

- "BQL" – "Heart of Gold" (5 March 2017)
- "Maraaya" – "Diamond Duck" (8 October 2017)
