= Vladimir Graić =

Serbian composer

Vladimir Graić (Serbian: Владимир Граић, born 19 February 1968) is a Serbian composer of popular, film and television music. Among other pieces, he composed the song Molitva, performed by Marija Šerifović, which won the Eurovision Song Contest 2007.

== Biography ==
Born in Belgrade, Serbia, to renowned composer Radoslav Graić, he had an affinity and showed aspiration for music from early childhood and began with private piano lessons at the age of four. While attending primary and secondary school, he continued simultaneously with his music education. At the age of six he was enrolled into the Music school “Josif Marinković” where he had piano lessons for 3 years. He then continued his studies in piano and theory from 1977 to 1982 at the Music school “Mokranjac”, the oldest, one of the most respectable and most renowned Serbian musical institution, representing the foundation of musical culture and education in Serbia and the former Yugoslavia. After he finished secondary school, he graduated from the University of Belgrade Faculty of Electrical Engineering.

In the beginning, he was mostly interested in electropop music, but soon after he introduced a pure pop sound and since then has been writing immensely popular "pop" songs. He has also composed in most other music genres such as rock, electric, artistic, children’s music, etc. and since 2000 he has also been involved with folk music in Serbia. Vladimir Graić always maintained that he wrote his serious pieces for himself and his less serious ones to make a living; nevertheless his melodic talent was so abundant that one can hardly distinguish a quality gradient between the two.

In 1996 he joined the Serbian state TV and radio broadcasting service Radio Television of Serbia (RTS), where he assumed the position of Music Editor of the RTS’s entertainment programme. After six years, in 2002 he was promoted to the position of the Editor in Chief for Music Production at RTS’s music publishing house PGP RTS records. He had been always active in recording, enriching Serbian discography with dozens of records. Since he has been in this position, PGP has had over 300 releases in classic, etno, pop, rock and folk categories.

During 14 years of his professional engagement at the RTS, he created as an author or music director numerous entertainment TV shows: Hit 2000, Sunday Afternoon (Nedeljno popodne), Music Hot Report, Impulse (Impuls)...

In 1996 he began collaboration with the Serbian theaters, and wrote music for several plays of the contemporary theatrical repertoire.

A versatile, many-sided personality, he used his talents in many more artistic activities: he co-founded and co-directed the biggest Serbian pop music festival “Beovizija”, first held in 2003, and organized by RTS, the Serbian national broadcaster. In 2004, it became the Serbian semi-final to choose songs for the final of “Evropesma” (Eurosong). The winner of Evropesma was to represent Serbia and Montenegro in the Eurovision Song Contest. In 2004 he founded the Radio Festival of Serbia (Radijski festival Srbije), organized by the most popular radio station in the country “Radio S”, promoting Serbian pop music. Apart from this, he has participated in all major music festivals as music director, member of the jury and author of compositions.

More than 20 of his compositions were awarded in different categories at music festivals throughout the country. His compositions have been awarded at international festivals as well:

- 1998 - International music festival Slovenski bazar, Belarus
- 2003 – "Universe Talent", Festival in Prague
- 2002, 2003 - Grand Prix at the International music festival “Sunflower” held in Zrenjanin (Serbia)
- 2007- Grand Prix at the Eurovision Song Contest in Helsinki, Finland (song "Molitva", sung by Marija Šerifović)
- 2012- Grand Prix at EMA in Slovenia and his song "Verjamem" represented Slovenia at the Eurovision Song Contest in Baku, Azerbaijan, sung by Eva Boto

Many of his compositions were entitled “Hit of the Year”, amongst others:

- 1994 - "Odlazi", sung by Maja Nikolić, which won the jury prize at MESAM, and received the Oscar for Popularity
- 1998 - "Uzmi me", sung by Maja Nikolić
- 2000 - "A u međuvremenu", sung by pop group OK Band
- 2006 – "Ludi letnji ples", sung by pop group Flamingosi
- 2007 - "Molitva", sung by Marija Šerifović

He was voted composer of the year on several occasions: 1994 (MESAM); 2000 (Oscar for Popularity); 2006 (“Zlatni melos”); 2007 (all over European countries)

He has also written the music for numerous advertising campaigns: Cosmopolitan (Serbian edition), Men's Health (Serbian edition), Hemofarm (International Pharmaceutical Group), Srbijašume (State Enterprise for Forest Management), Genex Kopaonik (Tourist Ski Center), etc.

From 1986 he is the member of the Association of jazz, popular and rock musicians in Serbia, and was the member of its Management Board from 1996 to 2000. He is also active as a member of the authors' music rights protection organization SOKOJ and he is member of Supervisory Board at the moment. From 1998 he is the member of the Composers' Association of Serbia and he is member of Management Board from 2011. From 2008 he was also member of GEMA.

== Eurovision Song Contest entries ==
Country	Year	Song	Artist	Place	Points	Marcel Bezençon Awards
Serbia	2007	"Molitva" (Молитва)	Marija Šerifović	1	268	Artistic Award
Slovenia	2012	"Verjamem"	Eva Boto	Failed to qualify		
Serbia	2015	"Beauty Never Lies"	Bojana Stamenov	10	53	

Preceded by Mr. Lordi	Eurovision Song Contest winning composers 2007	Succeeded by Jim Beanz
