= Henrik Szabo =

Swedish songwriter (born 1982)

- Born: December 18, 1982 (age 42); Malmö, Sweden

Henrik Szabo (born December 18, 1982) is a Swedish songwriter.

== Songwriting ==
Henrik Szabo has written songs for artists in Sweden, Denmark, Iceland, Portugal, Slovenia, Lithuania and Moldova and was part of the songwriting team LilyDock Studios. He has regularly worked with Swedish songwriters Jonas Gladnikoff and Daniel Nilsson, as well as Danish songwriters Christina Schilling and Camilla Gottschalck.

Henrik Szabo has contributed to several entries in pre-selections for the Eurovision Song Contest. He wrote the runner up in the Dansk Melodi Grand Prix 2009, the Danish final, with the song Someday performed by the Icelandic singer Hera Björk, which became a big hit and secured a win for Denmark in the OGAE Second Chance Contest 2009.

Henrik Szabo has written songs for several other artists, including the successful Swedish danceband Titanix and the Danish star and former Eurovision Song Contest entrant DQ.

== Other activities ==
Szabo is the managing director of the Tim Bergling Foundation,He is also an adjunct board member of Avicii AB. In addition, Henrik Szabo is a board member of Giva Sverige. He was formerly secretary general of Stiftelsen Läxhjälpen and a member of the board of Kompis Sverige.

== Entries in Eurovision Song Contest and national finals ==
- Someday by Hera Björk (Denmark 2009), 2nd place
- Tensão by Filipa Ruas (Portugal 2011), 4th place
- Run by Eva Boto (Slovenia 2012), 4th place
- Conquer My Heart by Svetlana Bogdanova (Moldova 2013), 11th place
- Dangerous (S. O. S.) (Lithuania 2015), 2nd place
