= Round and Round (Tinkara Kovač song) =

2014 single by Tinkara Kovač

"Round and Round/Spet"

Single by Tinkara Kovač
- Released: 15 May 2014
- Recorded: 2014
- Genre: Pop
- Length: 3:16
- Label: NAI
- Composer: Aleš Vovk
- Lyricists: Tinkara Kovač; Hannah Mancini; Tina Piš
- Producer: Raay

Tinkara Kovač singles chronology
"Spezzacuori" (2005)	"Round and Round/Spet" (2014)	"2X2" (2014)

Music video
- "Round and Round" on YouTube

Eurovision Song Contest 2014 entry
- Country: Slovenia
- Artist: Tinkara Kovač
- Languages: English, Slovene
- Composer: Aleš Vovk
- Lyricists: Tinkara Kovač; Hannah Mancini; Tina Piš

Finals performance
- Semi-final result: 10th
- Semi-final points: 52
- Final result: 25th
- Final points: 9

Entry chronology
- ◄ "Straight Into Love" (2013)
- "Here for you" (2015) ►

Song presentation
- file; help

Official performance video
- "Round and Round" (Final) on YouTube

"Round and Round" is a song by Slovene singer Tinkara Kovač. It represented Slovenia at the Eurovision Song Contest 2014 in Denmark after winning EMA 2014, where it was performed as "Spet/Round and Round".

== Eurovision Song Contest ==
The song was performed under the title "Spet/Round and Round" at EMA 2014 on 8 March 2014. It was chosen as one of two "superfinalists" through public televoting. In the second round of voting, the song received 7,937 televotes and therefore won the Slovene national final ahead of "Let Me Be (Myself)" performed by Muff, who had received 3,450 televotes.

At the Eurovision Song Contest 2014 in Copenhagen, the song was performed under its English title "Round and Round", while the lyrics were partially in Slovene and English just like in the national final. The song qualified from the second semi final having placed tenth in a field of 15, scoring 52 points in total. In the grand final, Slovenia only scored nine points in total and therefore finished 25th (second to last). It was only the third time overall since the introduction of the semifinals in 2004 that Slovenia had qualified for the final.

The song was co-written by Hannah Mancini, the Slovene representative in the Eurovision Song Contest 2013 and Raay, one half of the duo Maraaya, who would represent Slovenia in the Eurovision Song Contest 2015.

== Video clip ==
The original music video consisted only of the national final performance of the song and was submitted as official preview video for the Eurovision Song Contest. A professional video clip was shot in the Koper harbour, on the Adriatic coast of Slovenia and made available through eurovision.tv on 11 April 2014.

== Track listing ==
Digital download
No.	Title	Length
1.	"Round And Round" (Official ESC)	3:17^{1}
2.	"Spet" (Slovenian)	3:16
3.	"Round and Round" (International^{1})	3:17
4.	"Round and Round" (English)	3:00
5.	"Round and Round" (ESC Karaoke)	3:00
6.	"Round and Round" (ESC Instrumental)	3:00
7.	"Spet" (Karaoke Version)	3:16
8.	"Spet" (International Karaoke Version)	3:17
9.	"Spet" (F*G*Pella Edit)	3:19

== Notes ==
1. Even though the first track is labelled "Official ESC", it is 14 seconds longer than the version appearing on the official Eurovision Song Contest 2014 compilation album. According to the rules of the Eurovision Song Contest the maximum duration of each song is three minutes.
2. Includes lyrics in Slovene, Italian and English
