= Changes (Roman Lob album) =

Studio album by Roman Lob
- Released: 13 April 2012
- Length: 43:49
- Label: Universal Domestic Pop
- Producer: Beatgees; Brix; Thorsten Brötzmann; Thomas D; Michael Dörfler; Bertil Mark; Mathias Ramson

Roman Lob chronology
Changes (2012)	Home (2014)

Singles from Roman Lob
- 1. "Standing Still" Released: February 16, 2012; 2. "Call Out the Sun" Released: August 31, 2012

Changes is the debut studio album by German singer Roman Lob. It was released by Universal Music Domestic Pop on 13 April 2012 in German-speaking Europe. Recorded after Lob's win of Unser Star für Baku, the national pre-selection programme for the Eurovision Song Contest 2012, it was largely procued under the guidance of musician Thomas D, with additional production from André "Brix" Buchmann, Thorsten Brötzmann, Michael Dörfler, Bertil Mark, Mathias Ramson, and production team Beatgees.

The album earned largely mixed to positive reviews from music critics, some of whom felt that it was uneven but praised Lob's vocal performance. Changes debuted and peaked at number nine on the German Albums Chart and reached the top 50 in Austria. It was preceded by lead single "Standing Still," Germany's 2012 Eurovision Song Contest entry in Baku, which finished in 8th place and became a top three hit in Germany. A second single, "Call Out the Sun," failed to chart.

== Singles ==
Changes was preceded by lead single "Standing Still," Germany's entry at the Eurovision Song Contest 2012 in Baku, Azerbaijan. Issued by Universal Domestic Pop on May 26, 2012, it peaked at number three on the German Singles Chart and finished in eighth place with 110 points on 26 May, 2012. After Lob's performance on the night of the contest, it also entered some international charts. "Call Out the Sun" was released as the album's second and final single on August 31, 2012 but failed to chart.

== Critical reception ==
Professional ratings
Review scores
Source	Rating
laut.de	2/5 stars
Plattentests	4/10

Amelie Köppl from laut.de rated the album two out of five stars. She found that Changes "turns out to be too clumsy and inconsistent for Roman Lob's previously praised musical ambitions. His slightly smoky, pleasant voice doesn't come into its own enough due to all the changes in style. Lob is obviously a born ballad singer, but that raises the question of why they didn't want to stick to the general direction of "Standing Still", "Day By Day" or "Revolution" and not just put the young man in front of his piano has set." Frankfurter Allgemeine Zeitung critic Dieter Bartetz felt that Lob had "already proven that he has what it takes to withstand it. But he still has to prove that he, the exceptional talent, cannot be smoothed over musically. His debut album points in both directions, the smooth and the rough."

== Track listing ==
Changes track listing
No.	Title	Writer(s)	Producer(s)	Length
1.	"Call Out the Sun"	Duncan Townsend; Leonard Valentin Lazar; Daniel Stroyanov	Thomas D; Michael "Mitch" Dörfler	3:05
2.	"Dream on"	Dominik Schäfer; Hans Tauscheck	Bertil Mark	2:51
3.	"Standing Still"	Wayne Hector; Steve Robson; Jamie Cullum	Dörfler; Mark	3:26
4.	"Alone"	Emanuel Kiriakou; Gary Go	Thorsten Brötzmann	3:29
5.	"Changes"	Thomas Dürr; Dörfler; Tina Dürr; Carsten Thonack; Lob	Thomas D; Dörfler	3:08
6.	"Flying"	Schäfer	Mark	2:50
7.	"Make You Smile"	Farhot; Malika Ferguson	Thomas D; Dörfler	2:53
8.	"Day By Day"	Lob; Dejan Stankovic; Christoph Zimmermann	Thomas D; Dörfler	3:30
9.	"After Tonight"	Haydain Neale; Justin Nozuka	Thomas D; Dörfler	3:44
10.	"Something Stupid"	Christian Neander; Bryn Christopher; Beatgees	Beatgees	3:40
11.	"First Time"	Dürr; Mark; Dörfler; Lob	Thomas D; Dörfler	3:37
12.	"Conflicted"	Martin Mulholland	Brix; Mathias Ramson	3:50
13.	"Revolution"	Andre Schild; Justin Hopkins; Alex Breuner	Thomas D; Dörfler	4:01

== Charts ==
Weekly chart performance for Changes
Chart (2012)	Peak position
Austrian Albums (Ö3 Austria)	50
German Albums (Offizielle Top 100)	9
Swiss Albums (Schweizer Hitparade)	81

== Release history ==
Changes release history
Region	Date	Format(s)	Label	Ref.
Various	13 April 2012	CD; digital download	Universal Domestic Pop	
