= Slovenia in the Eurovision Song Contest 2014 =

- Eurovision Song Contest 2014
- Participating broadcaster: Radiotelevizija Slovenija (RTVSLO)
- Country: Slovenia
- Selection process: Evrovizijska Melodija 2014
- Selection date: 8 March 2014

Competing entry
- Song: "Round and Round"
- Artist: Tinkara Kovač
- Songwriters: Raay; Tinkara Kovač; Hannah Mancini; Tina Piš

Placement
- Semi-final result: Qualified (10th, 52 points)
- Final result: 25th, 9 points

Participation chronology

Slovenia was represented at the Eurovision Song Contest 2014 with the song "Round and Round", written by Raay, Tinkara Kovač, Hannah Mancini, and Tina Piš, and performed by Tinkara Kovač. The Slovene participating broadcaster, Radiotelevizija Slovenija (RTVSLO), organised the national final Evrovizijska Melodija 2014 in order to select its entry for the contest. Seven entries competed in the national final where the winner was selected over two rounds of public televoting. In the first round, the top two entries were selected. In the second round, "Round and Round" performed by Tinkara Kovač was selected as the winner. Songwriter Hannah Mancini represented Slovenia in the Eurovision Song Contest 2013 where she failed to qualify to the final with the song "Straight into Love".

Slovenia was drawn to compete in the second semi-final of the Eurovision Song Contest which took place on 8 May 2014. Performing during the show in position 14, "Round and Round" was announced among the top 10 entries of the second semi-final and therefore qualified to compete in the final on 10 May. It was later revealed that Slovenia placed tenth out of the 15 participating countries in the semi-final with 52 points. In the final, Slovenia performed in position 17 and placed twenty-fifth out of the 26 participating countries, scoring 9 points.

== Background ==
Prior to the 2014 contest, Radiotelevizija Slovenija (RTVSLO) had participated in the Eurovision Song Contest representing Slovenia nineteen times since its first entry in 1993. Its highest placing in the contest, to this point, has been seventh place, achieved on two occasions: in 1995 with the song "Prisluhni mi" performed by Darja Švajger and in 2001 with the song "Energy" performed by Nuša Derenda. The country's only other top ten result was achieved in 1997 when Tanja Ribič performing "Zbudi se" placed tenth. Since the introduction of semi-finals to the format of the contest in 2004, Slovenia had thus far only managed to qualify to the final on two occasions. In 2013, "Straight into Love" performed by Hannah failed to qualify to the final.

As part of its duties as participating broadcaster, RTVSLO organises the selection of its entry in the Eurovision Song Contest and broadcasts the event in the country. After two deadline extensions, the broadcaster confirmed its participation in the 2014 contest on 17 January 2014 after being able to find the necessary funding for participation. RTVSLO has traditionally selected its entry through a national final entitled Evrovizijska Melodija (EMA), which has been produced with variable formats. To this point, the broadcaster has only foregone the use of this national final in 2013 when the entry was internally selected. For 2014, the broadcaster opted to organise Evrovizijska Melodija 2014 (EMA 2014) to select its entry.

== Before Eurovision ==
=== EMA 2014 ===
EMA 2014 was the 18th edition of the Slovenian national final format Evrovizijska Melodija (EMA), used by RTV Slovenija to select Slovenia's entry for the Eurovision Song Contest 2014. The competition took place at the RTV Slovenija Studio 1 in Ljubljana, hosted by Ula Furlan and was broadcast on TV SLO 1, TV Maribor, Radio Val 202, Radio Koper, Radio Maribor and online via the official Eurovision Song Contest website eurovision.tv.

==== Competing entries ====
An expert committee consisting of Miša Molk (RTV Slovenija Eurovision project manager), Darja Švajger (1995 and 1999 Slovenian Eurovision entrant) and Andrea F. (radio host, musician and producer) nominated 29 artists and composers to be directly invited by the broadcaster to submit entries. An additional 42 entries from artists and composers who did not receive an invitation were also considered. The committee selected seven artists and songs for the competition from the received submissions. The competing artists were announced on 7 February 2014. Among the competing artists was former Slovenian Eurovision contestant Omar Naber who represented Slovenia in 2005.

==== Final ====
EMA 2014 took place on 8 March 2014. In addition to the performances of the competing entries, 2011 Slovenian Eurovision entrant Maja Keuc performed as a guest. The winner was selected over two rounds of public televoting. In the first round, two entries were selected to proceed to the second round. In the second round, "Spet/Round and Round" performed by Tinkara Kovač was selected as the winner.

Final – 8 March 2014
| R/O | Artist | Song | Songwriter(s) | Result |
|---|---|---|---|---|
| 1 | Omar Naber | "I Won't Give Up" | Omar Naber | —N/a |
| 2 | Nermin Puškar and Samuel Lucas | "Masquerade" | Krešimir Tomec, Igor Leonardi, Nermin Puškar, Lejla Delalić, Donna Osterc | —N/a |
| 3 | Bilbi | "To ni blues" | Maja Pihler Stermecki, Gregor Stermecki | —N/a |
| 4 | Nude | "It's Gonna Be OK!" | Gaber Marolt | —N/a |
| 5 | Rudi Bučar feat. Elevators | "Tja" | Rudi Bučar | —N/a |
| 6 | Tinkara Kovač | "Spet/Round and Round" | Raay, Tinkara Kovač, Hannah Mancini, Tina Piš | Advanced |
| 7 | Muff | "Let Me Be (Myself)" | Tadej Košir, Anže Kacafura, Miha Gorše, Senida Hajdarpašić | Advanced |

Superfinal – 8 March 2014
| R/O | Artist | Song | Televote | Place |
|---|---|---|---|---|
| 1 | Tinkara Kovač | "Spet/Round and Round" | 7,932 | 1 |
| 2 | Muff | "Let Me Be (Myself)" | 3,450 | 2 |

== At Eurovision ==
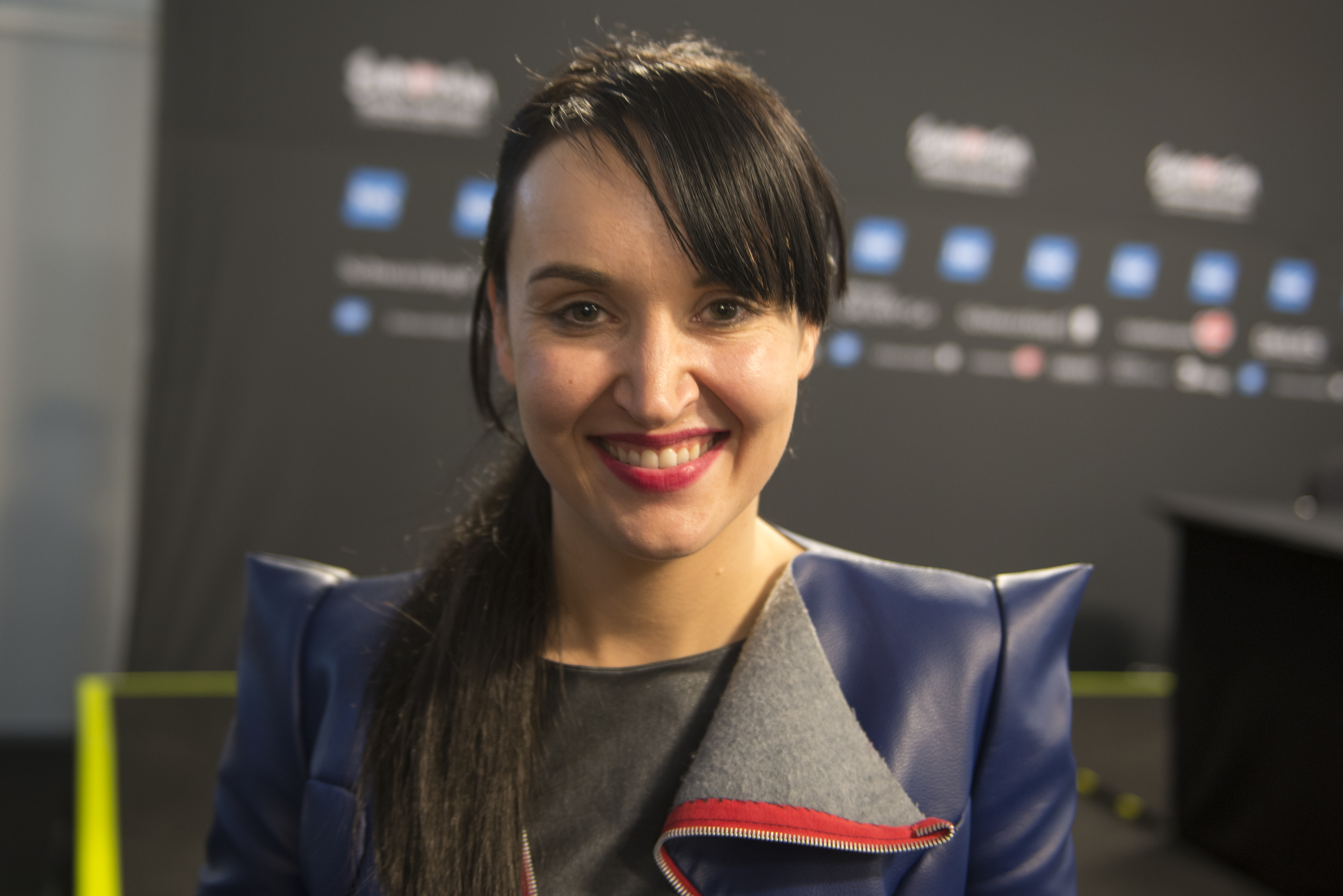
Tinkara Kovač during a press meet and greet

According to Eurovision rules, all nations with the exceptions of the host country and the "Big Five" (France, Germany, Italy, Spain and the United Kingdom) are required to qualify from one of two semi-finals in order to compete for the final; the top ten countries from each semi-final progress to the final. The European Broadcasting Union (EBU) split up the competing countries into six different pots based on voting patterns from previous contests, with countries with favourable voting histories put into the same pot. On 20 January 2014, an allocation draw was held which placed each country into one of the two semi-finals, as well as which half of the show they would perform in. Slovenia was placed into the second semi-final, to be held on 8 May 2014, and was scheduled to perform in the second half of the show.

Once all the competing songs for the 2014 contest had been released, the running order for the semi-finals was decided by the shows' producers rather than through another draw, so that similar songs were not placed next to each other. Slovenia was set to perform in position 14, following the entry from Greece and before the entry from Romania.

In Slovenia, the semi-finals were televised on TV SLO 2 and the final was televised on TV SLO 1 and Televizija Maribor. All shows featured commentated by Andrej Hofer. The contest was also broadcast via radio with the second semi-final and final airing on Radio Val 202 and Radio Maribor. The Slovenian spokesperson, who announced the Slovenian votes during the final, was Ula Furlan.

=== Semi-final ===
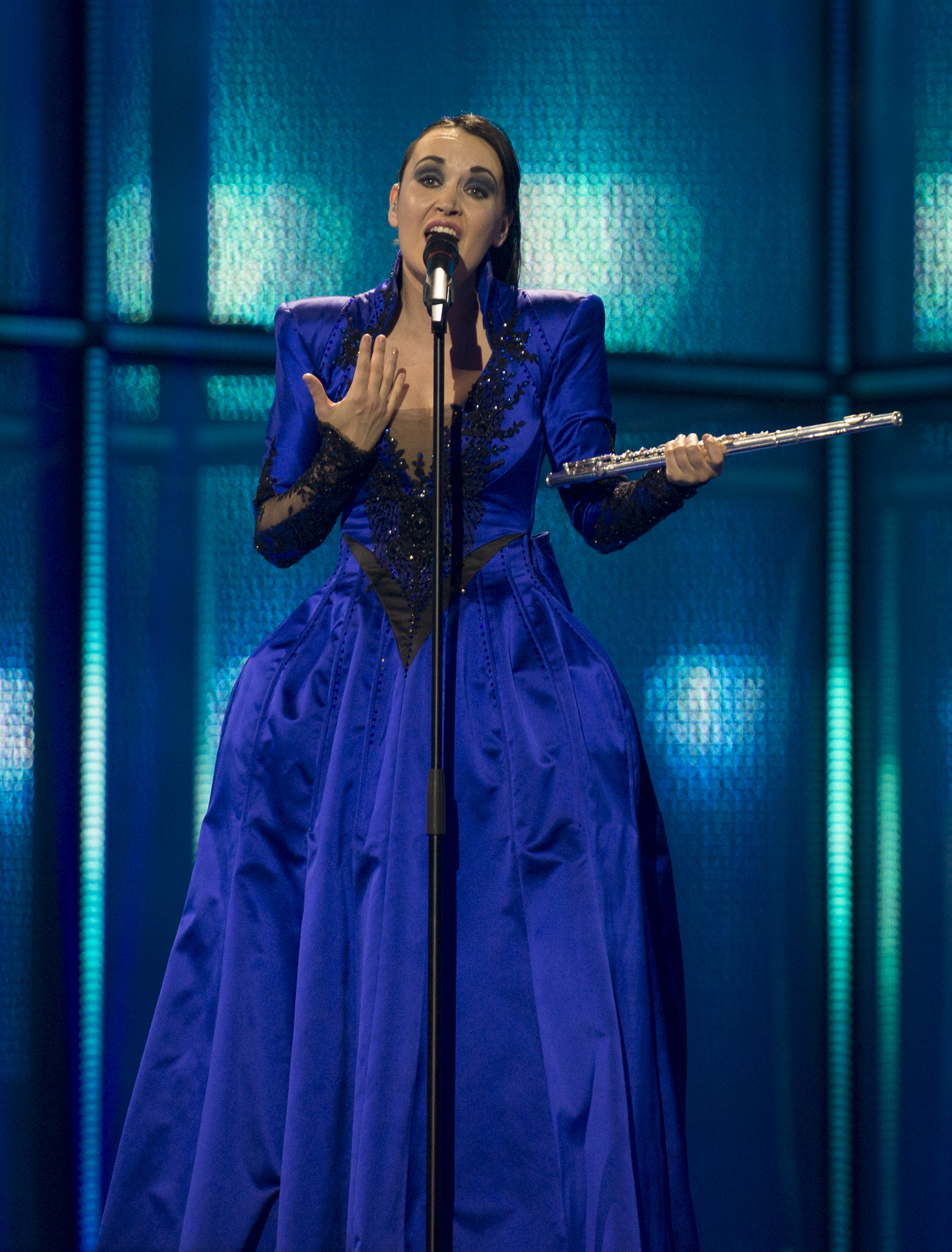
Tinkara Kovač during a rehearsal before the second semi-final

Tinkara Kovač took in technical rehearsals on 30 April and 3 May, followed by dress rehearsals on 7 and 8 May. This included the jury final on 7 May where the professional juries of each country watched and voted on the competing entries.

The Slovenian performance featured Kovač performing in a blue dress and playing the flute. The stage colours transitioned from blue to gold as the song progressed, and the main cube structure of the stage emitted dotted yellow lights which resembled a starry sky. The LED screen floor projected circles turning around Kovač. Kovač was joined by four on-stage backing vocalists: Manca Špik, Nika Zorjan, Lea Sirk and the co-composer of "Round and Round" Aleš Vovk (Raay). Sirk would go on to represent Slovenia in the Eurovision Song Contest 2018.

At the end of the show, Slovenia was announced as having finished in the top 10 and subsequently qualifying for the grand final. It was later revealed that Slovenia placed tenth in the semi-final, receiving a total of 52 points.

=== Final ===
Shortly after the second semi-final, a winners' press conference was held for the ten qualifying countries. As part of this press conference, the qualifying artists took part in a draw to determine which half of the grand final they would subsequently participate in. This draw was done in the order the countries appeared in the semi-final running order. Slovenia was drawn to compete in the second half. Following this draw, the shows' producers decided upon the running order of the final, as they had done for the semi-finals. Slovenia was subsequently placed to perform in position 17, following the entry from Italy and before the entry from Finland.

Tinkara Kovač once again took part in dress rehearsals on 9 and 10 May before the final, including the jury final where the professional juries cast their final votes before the live show. Tinkara Kovač performed a repeat of her semi-final performance during the final on 10 May. Slovenia placed twenty-fifth in the final, scoring 9 points.

=== Voting ===
Voting during the three shows consisted of 50 percent public televoting and 50 percent from a jury deliberation. The jury consisted of five music industry professionals who were citizens of the country they represent, with their names published before the contest to ensure transparency. This jury was asked to judge each contestant based on: vocal capacity; the stage performance; the song's composition and originality; and the overall impression by the act. In addition, no member of a national jury could be related in any way to any of the competing acts in such a way that they cannot vote impartially and independently. The individual rankings of each jury member were released shortly after the grand final.

Following the release of the full split voting by the EBU after the conclusion of the competition, it was revealed that Slovenia had placed twenty-fifth with the public televote and twenty-fourth with the jury vote in the final. In the public vote, Slovenia scored 15 points, while with the jury vote, Slovenia scored 21 points. In the second semi-final, Slovenia placed ninth with the public televote with 48 points and eighth with the jury vote, scoring 60 points.

Below is a breakdown of points awarded to Slovenia and awarded by Slovenia in the second semi-final and grand final of the contest, and the breakdown of the jury voting and televoting conducted during the two shows:

==== Points awarded to Slovenia ====
Points awarded to Slovenia (Semi-final 2)
| Score | Country |
|---|---|
| 12 points | |
| 10 points | |
| 8 points | Israel |
| 7 points | Austria; Italy |
| 6 points | Romania; Switzerland |
| 5 points | |
| 4 points | Georgia; Norway |
| 3 points | Lithuania; Poland |
| 2 points | Finland; United Kingdom |
| 1 point | |

Points awarded to Slovenia (Final)
| Score | Country |
|---|---|
| 12 points | |
| 10 points | |
| 8 points | Montenegro |
| 7 points | |
| 6 points | |
| 5 points | |
| 4 points | |
| 3 points | |
| 2 points | |
| 1 point | Macedonia |

==== Points awarded by Slovenia ====
Points awarded by Slovenia (Semi-final 2)
| Score | Country |
|---|---|
| 12 points | Macedonia |
| 10 points | Austria |
| 8 points | Switzerland |
| 7 points | Romania |
| 6 points | Belarus |
| 5 points | Poland |
| 4 points | Norway |
| 3 points | Greece |
| 2 points | Finland |
| 1 point | Ireland |

Points awarded by Slovenia (Final)
| Score | Country |
|---|---|
| 12 points | Austria |
| 10 points | Netherlands |
| 8 points | Sweden |
| 7 points | Montenegro |
| 6 points | Denmark |
| 5 points | Norway |
| 4 points | Spain |
| 3 points | Switzerland |
| 2 points | Germany |
| 1 point | Poland |

==== Detailed voting results ====
The following members comprised the Slovene jury:

- Helena Blagne (jury chairperson) – singer
- Anže Langus Petrović – musician, composer, producer
- Robert Pikl – singer, guitar player, composer
- Izak Košir – singer, music journalist, author
- Alja Omladič (Alya) – singer

Detailed voting results from Slovenia (Semi-final 2)
| R/O | Country | H. Blagne | A. Langus Petrović | R. Pikl | I. Košir | Alya | Jury Rank | Televote Rank | Combined Rank | Points |
|---|---|---|---|---|---|---|---|---|---|---|
| 01 | Malta | 7 | 7 | 5 | 7 | 10 | 8 | 11 | 11 | |
| 02 | Israel | 8 | 12 | 10 | 3 | 9 | 10 | 12 | 12 | |
| 03 | Norway | 10 | 1 | 3 | 12 | 3 | 3 | 10 | 7 | 4 |
| 04 | Georgia | 14 | 8 | 14 | 14 | 14 | 14 | 14 | 14 | |
| 05 | Poland | 11 | 4 | 1 | 13 | 4 | 6 | 7 | 6 | 5 |
| 06 | Austria | 5 | 2 | 2 | 1 | 2 | 1 | 2 | 2 | 10 |
| 07 | Lithuania | 6 | 13 | 12 | 9 | 13 | 12 | 13 | 13 | |
| 08 | Finland | 13 | 6 | 7 | 6 | 6 | 9 | 9 | 9 | 2 |
| 09 | Ireland | 9 | 10 | 13 | 10 | 8 | 11 | 8 | 10 | 1 |
| 10 | Belarus | 2 | 9 | 9 | 5 | 7 | 5 | 6 | 5 | 6 |
| 11 | Macedonia | 4 | 3 | 4 | 4 | 1 | 2 | 1 | 1 | 12 |
| 12 | Switzerland | 3 | 5 | 8 | 2 | 11 | 4 | 4 | 3 | 8 |
| 13 | Greece | 12 | 11 | 11 | 11 | 12 | 13 | 5 | 8 | 3 |
| 14 | Slovenia | | | | | | | | | |
| 15 | Romania | 1 | 14 | 6 | 8 | 5 | 7 | 3 | 4 | 7 |

Detailed voting results from Slovenia (Final)
| R/O | Country | H. Blagne | A. Langus Petrović | R. Pikl | I. Košir | Alya | Jury Rank | Televote Rank | Combined Rank | Points |
|---|---|---|---|---|---|---|---|---|---|---|
| 01 | Ukraine | 12 | 22 | 15 | 14 | 9 | 14 | 19 | 20 | |
| 02 | Belarus | 10 | 14 | 13 | 19 | 20 | 17 | 12 | 14 | |
| 03 | Azerbaijan | 11 | 2 | 3 | 3 | 18 | 5 | 25 | 16 | |
| 04 | Iceland | 3 | 6 | 6 | 4 | 4 | 2 | 24 | 12 | |
| 05 | Norway | 18 | 5 | 2 | 5 | 5 | 4 | 13 | 6 | 5 |
| 06 | Romania | 21 | 17 | 12 | 24 | 25 | 23 | 8 | 17 | |
| 07 | Armenia | 24 | 12 | 21 | 16 | 24 | 22 | 20 | 24 | |
| 08 | Montenegro | 23 | 3 | 10 | 17 | 10 | 12 | 3 | 4 | 7 |
| 09 | Poland | 9 | 7 | 4 | 15 | 19 | 10 | 14 | 10 | 1 |
| 10 | Greece | 8 | 25 | 23 | 25 | 23 | 24 | 10 | 21 | |
| 11 | Austria | 1 | 1 | 1 | 1 | 1 | 1 | 1 | 1 | 12 |
| 12 | Germany | 6 | 11 | 8 | 11 | 2 | 6 | 16 | 9 | 2 |
| 13 | Sweden | 13 | 15 | 9 | 9 | 6 | 9 | 5 | 3 | 8 |
| 14 | France | 5 | 23 | 14 | 21 | 8 | 13 | 23 | 22 | |
| 15 | Russia | 20 | 13 | 20 | 10 | 22 | 18 | 15 | 18 | |
| 16 | Italy | 14 | 24 | 19 | 18 | 11 | 19 | 6 | 11 | |
| 17 | Slovenia | | | | | | | | | |
| 18 | Finland | 22 | 10 | 16 | 13 | 13 | 15 | 18 | 19 | |
| 19 | Spain | 4 | 19 | 11 | 12 | 3 | 7 | 11 | 7 | 4 |
| 20 | Switzerland | 19 | 8 | 22 | 6 | 21 | 16 | 4 | 8 | 3 |
| 21 | Hungary | 17 | 20 | 24 | 20 | 14 | 21 | 9 | 15 | |
| 22 | Malta | 16 | 9 | 7 | 8 | 15 | 11 | 17 | 13 | |
| 23 | Denmark | 2 | 16 | 18 | 7 | 7 | 8 | 7 | 5 | 6 |
| 24 | Netherlands | 7 | 4 | 5 | 2 | 12 | 3 | 2 | 2 | 10 |
| 25 | San Marino | 25 | 21 | 25 | 22 | 16 | 25 | 22 | 25 | |
| 26 | United Kingdom | 15 | 18 | 17 | 23 | 17 | 20 | 21 | 23 | |
