= Slovenia in the Eurovision Song Contest 2012 =

- Eurovision Song Contest 2012
- Participating broadcaster: Radiotelevizija Slovenija (RTVSLO)
- Country: Slovenia
- Selection process: Misija EMA 2012
- Selection date: 26 February 2012

Competing entry
- Song: "Verjamem"
- Artist: Eva Boto
- Songwriters: Vladimir Graić; Hari Mata Hari; Igor Pirkovič

Placement
- Semi-final result: Failed to qualify (17th)

Participation chronology

Slovenia was represented at the Eurovision Song Contest 2012 with the song "Verjamem" written by Vladimir Graić, Hari Mata Hari, and Igor Pirkovič, and performed by Eva Boto. The Slovene participating broadcaster, Radiotelevizija Slovenija (RTVSLO), organised the national final Misija EMA 2012 in order to select its entry for the contest. 32 performers competed in the first stage of the national final, Misija Evrovizija, from which two artists qualified to compete in Misija EMA 2012 following a five-month-long competition. In Misija EMA 2012, the winner was selected over two rounds of voting. In the first round, each artist performed three songs and one song were selected for each performer following the combination of votes from a four-member jury panel and a public televote. In the second round, "Verjamem" performed by Eva Boto was selected as the winner entirely by a public televote. Songwriter Hari Mata Hari represented Bosnia and Herzegovina in 2006 with the song "Lejla" where he placed third in the grand final of the competition.

Slovenia was drawn to compete in the second semi-final of the Eurovision Song Contest which took place on 24 May 2012. Performing during the show in position 9, "Verjamem" was not announced among the top 10 entries of the second semi-final and therefore did not qualify to compete in the final. It was later revealed that Slovenia placed seventeenth out of the 18 participating countries in the semi-final with 31 points.

== Background ==
Prior to the 2012 contest, Radiotelevizija Slovenija (RTVSLO) had participated in the Eurovision Song Contest representing Slovenia seventeen times since its first entry in 1993. Its highest placing in the contest, to this point, has been seventh place, achieved on two occasions: in 1995 with the song "Prisluhni mi" performed by Darja Švajger and in 2001 with the song "Energy" performed by Nuša Derenda. The country's only other top ten result was achieved in 1997 when Tanja Ribič performing "Zbudi se" placed tenth. Since the introduction of semi-finals to the format of the contest in 2004, Slovenia had thus far only managed to qualify to the final on two occasions. In 2011, "No One" performed by Maja Keuc qualified to the final and placed thirteenth.

As part of its duties as participating broadcaster, RTVSLO organises the selection of its entry in the Eurovision Song Contest and broadcasts the event in the country. The broadcaster confirmed its participation in the 2012 contest on 24 June 2011. RTVSLO has traditionally selected its entry through a national final entitled Evrovizijska Melodija (EMA), which has been produced with variable formats. For 2012, the broadcaster opted to organise EMA 2012 and launched the newly-created talent selection Misija Evrovizija that acted as a preselector for EMA itself.

== Before Eurovision ==
=== Misija Evrovizija ===
Misija Evrovizija was first phase of the 17th edition of the Slovenian national final format Evrovizijska Melodija (EMA), used by RTV Slovenija to select Slovenia's entry for the Eurovision Song Contest 2012. The competition involved a five-month-long process that commenced on 26 August 2011 and concluded on 8 January 2012. All shows in the competition took place at the RTV Slovenija Studio 1 in Ljubljana, hosted by Klemen Slakonja and 2011 Slovenian Eurovision entrant Maja Keuc and was broadcast on TV SLO 1 and online via the broadcaster's website rtvslo.si.

==== Format ====
The format of the competition consisted of two stages. The first stage was the auditions which took place in various cities across Slovenia. Thirty-two contestants were selected and proceeded to the second stage, the twelve live shows held between 2 October 2011 and 8 January 2012. Each of the first four live shows featured eight contestants and public televoting exclusively determined two of the performers to remain in the competition. An additional two contestants were saved by a four-member judging panel out of the remaining six performers; the bottom four contestants were eliminated. The fifth and sixth shows each featured eight of the sixteen remaining contestants and four were selected to proceed in the competition in a similar process as in the first four shows. In each of the seventh to tenth shows, the judges selected two contestants to be up for eviction and public televoting exclusively determined the one who would be eliminated from the competition. The remaining four contestants proceeded to the eleventh show, the semi-final, where a public televote selected two contestants to be up for eviction and the judges determined the one who would be eliminated from the competition. Three candidates competed in the twelfth show, the final, where a public televote first selected one contestant to proceed to Misija EMA 2012. The judges then selected an additional qualifier for Misija EMA 2012 out of the two remaining contestants.

==== Judges ====
A four-member judging panel determined the contestants that would advance to the live shows, commented on the contestants' performances during the live shows and selected those who would be exempt for elimination. The judging panel consisted of:

- Darja Švajger – 1995 and 1999 Slovenian Eurovision entrant
- Jonas Žnidaršič – Television personality
- Raay – Singer-songwriter
- Tina Marinšek – Singer

==== Contestants ====
Performers were able submit their applications to the broadcaster between 26 August 2011 and 30 August 2011 by submitting an online submission form or attending auditions that took place between 26 and 30 August 2011 in the following cities and locations:

- 26 August 2011: Celje (Celje National Hall)
- 27 August 2011: Novo Mesto (Janez Trdina Cultural Centre)
- 28 August 2011: Koper (Koper Theatre)
- 29 August 2011: Maribor (Maribor Town Hall)
- 30 August 2011: Ljubljana (Ljubljana Festival Hall)

350 applications were received by the broadcaster and the competition producers shortlisted 130 candidates for the judges' auditions that took place between 10 and 12 September 2011 at the Radio Slovenija Studio 26 in Ljubljana. Following the judges' auditions, thirty-two contestants were selected for the live shows.

==== Results summary ====
Colour key
– Contestant was eliminated
– Contestant was in the bottom two

Contestant	Show 1	Show 2	Show 3	Show 4	Show 5	Show 6	Show 7	Show 8	Show 9	Show 10	Show 11 (Semi-final)	Show 12 (Final)
Eva Boto	—N/a	Safe	—N/a	—N/a	Safe	—N/a	1st	1st	2nd	1st	1st	Safe
Eva and Nika Prusnik	—N/a	—N/a	Safe	—N/a	Safe	—N/a	2nd	2nd	1st	1st	3rd	Safe
Nika Zorjan	—N/a	—N/a	Safe	—N/a	—N/a	Safe	3rd	3rd	4th	4th	2nd	3rd
Manuela Brečko	—N/a	—N/a	Safe	—N/a	—N/a	Safe	4th	3rd	3rd	3rd	4th	Eliminated (Show 11)
Flora Ema Lotrič	—N/a	Safe	—N/a	—N/a	Safe	—N/a	7th	5th	5th	5th	Eliminated (Show 10)	
Brina Vidic	Safe	—N/a	—N/a	—N/a	—N/a	Safe	5th	6th	6th	Eliminated (Show 9)		
Nadja Irgolič	Safe	—N/a	—N/a	—N/a	—N/a	Safe	6th	7th	Eliminated (Show 8)			
Gašper Rifelj	—N/a	Safe	—N/a	—N/a	Safe	—N/a	8th	Eliminated (Show 7)				
David Matići	—N/a	—N/a	—N/a	Safe	—N/a	Out	Eliminated (Show 6)					
Klemen Orter	Safe	—N/a	—N/a	—N/a	—N/a	Out	Eliminated (Show 6)					
Nastja Gabor	—N/a	Safe	—N/a	—N/a	—N/a	Out	Eliminated (Show 6)					
Sara Jagrič	—N/a	—N/a	—N/a	Safe	—N/a	Out	Eliminated (Show 6)					
Aljoša Keber	Safe	—N/a	—N/a	—N/a	Out	Eliminated (Show 5)						
Barbara Vauda	—N/a	—N/a	—N/a	Safe	Out	Eliminated (Show 5)						
Maja Založnik	—N/a	—N/a	—N/a	Safe	Out	Eliminated (Show 5)						
Sarah Senica	—N/a	—N/a	Safe	—N/a	Out	Eliminated (Show 5)						
Alino Juhart	—N/a	—N/a	—N/a	Out	Eliminated (Show 4)							
Maks Verderber	—N/a	—N/a	—N/a	Out	Eliminated (Show 4)							
Me 4	—N/a	—N/a	—N/a	Out	Eliminated (Show 4)							
Tanja Srednik	—N/a	—N/a	—N/a	Out	Eliminated (Show 4)							
Adrijana Lorber	—N/a	—N/a	Out	Eliminated (Show 3)								
Alex Volasko	—N/a	—N/a	Out	Eliminated (Show 3)								
Klemen Mramor	—N/a	—N/a	Out	Eliminated (Show 3)								
Nina Bauman	—N/a	—N/a	Out	Eliminated (Show 3)								
Domonik Vodopivec	—N/a	Out	Eliminated (Show 2)									
Leaparfume	—N/a	Out	Eliminated (Show 2)									
Sara Špelec	—N/a	Out	Eliminated (Show 2)									
Ž-Lajf	—N/a	Out	Eliminated (Show 2)									
Biba & Bibitas	Out	Eliminated (Show 1)										
Janja Kobale	Out	Eliminated (Show 1)										
Sylvo	Out	Eliminated (Show 1)										
Tamara Goričanec	Out	Eliminated (Show 1)										

==== Elimination shows ====
The ten elimination shows of Misija Evrovizija took place between 2 October 2011 and 11 December 2011. In each of the first sixth shows, the contestants first faced a public televote where the top two proceeded in the competition. An additional two qualifiers were then selected by the judges out of the remaining contestants. In each of the seventh to tenth shows, the judges selected two contestants up for eviction, with one of them being saved by a public televote.

Saved by the public vote Saved by the jury

Show 1 – 2 October 2011
R/O	Artist	Song (Original artists)	Jury		Televote		Result
R/O	Artist	Song (Original artists)	Votes	Rank	Votes	Rank	Result
1	Janja Kobale	"Rolling in the Deep" (Adele)	11	6	400	4	Eliminated
2	Sylvo	"Tainted Love" (Soft Cell)	14	5	111	8	Eliminated
3	Klemen Orter	"Over the Rainbow" (Judy Garland)	29	1	282	5	Safe
4	Tamara Goričanec	"Ključ do srca" (Anja Rupel)	11	6	182	7	Eliminated
5	Biba and Bibitas	"Moon River" (Audrey Hepburn)	5	8	169	6	Eliminated
6	Nadja Irgolič	"The Climb" (Miley Cyrus)	21	4	628	1	Safe
7	Aljoša Keber	"Grenade" (Bruno Mars)	27	2	422	3	Safe
8	Brina Vidic	"You Know I'm No Good" (Amy Winehouse)	26	3	506	2	Safe

Show 2 – 9 October 2011
R/O	Artist	Song (Original artists)	Jury		Televote		Result
R/O	Artist	Song (Original artists)	Votes	Rank	Votes	Rank	Result
1	Gašper Rifelj	"Bed of Roses" (Bon Jovi)	18	5	1,114	2	Safe
2	Flora Ema Lotrič	"Stuck" (Caro Emerald)	23	2	962	3	Safe
3	Ž-Lajf	"Sex Bomb" (Tom Jones)	14	6	607	5	Eliminated
4	Leaparfume	"Hvala za vijolice" (Bilbi)	21	4	646	4	Eliminated
5	Nastja Gabor	"Molitva" (Marija Šerifović)	21	3	583	6	Safe
6	Sara Špelec	"The Show Must Go On" (Queen)	7	8	99	8	Eliminated
7	Domonik Vodopivec	"Plan B" (Anžej Dežan)	11	7	396	7	Eliminated
8	Eva Boto	"Because of You" (Kelly Clarkson)	29	1	1,306	1	Safe

Show 3 – 16 October 2011
R/O	Artist	Song (Original artists)	Jury		Televote		Result
R/O	Artist	Song (Original artists)	Votes	Rank	Votes	Rank	Result
1	Manuela Brečko	"Something in the Water" (Brooke Fraser)	23	2	737	3	Safe
2	Alex Volasko	"Stop" (Omar Naber)	11	6	282	8	Eliminated
3	Adrijana Lorber	"Price Tag" (Jessie J)	15	5	320	6	Eliminated
4	Nina Bauman	"Superwoman" (Alicia Keys)	10	7	305	7	Eliminated
5	Sarah Senica	"Veter z juga" (Tinkara Kovač)	19	4	876	2	Safe
6	Eva and Nika Prusnik	"Je veux" (Zaz)	30	1	658	4	Safe
7	Klemen Mramor	"Use Somebody" (Kings of Leon)	8	8	525	5	Eliminated
8	Nika Zorjan	"Listen" (Beyoncé)	28	3	1,579	1	Safe

Show 4 – 23 October 2011
R/O	Artist	Song (Original artists)	Jury		Televote		Result
R/O	Artist	Song (Original artists)	Votes	Rank	Votes	Rank	Result
1	Maja Založnik	"Love You I Do" (Jennifer Hudson)	25	1	621	5	Safe
2	Alino Juhart	"Valerie" (The Zutons)	15	6	409	7	Eliminated
3	Tanja Srednik	"Blues in the Night" (Blues in the Night)	12	7	226	8	Eliminated
4	Me 4	"Mercy" (Duffy)	22	2	682	4	Eliminated
5	Barbara Vauda	"Saving All My Love for You" (Whitney Houston)	19	5	906	2	Safe
6	David Matiči	"Let Me Entertain You" (Robbie Williams)	22	2	789	3	Safe
7	Maks Verderber	"Somewhere There's a Someone" (Dean Martin)	9	8	418	6	Eliminated
8	Sara Jagrič	"Hallelujah" (Leonard Cohen)	20	4	929	1	Safe

Show 5 – 30 October 2011
R/O	Artist	Song (Original artists)	Jury		Televote		Result
R/O	Artist	Song (Original artists)	Votes	Rank	Votes	Rank	Result
1	Aljoša Keber	"Born This Way" (Lady Gaga)	21	3	313	8	Eliminated
2	Maja Založnik	"V meni je moč" (Alenka Godec)	14	5	333	7	Eliminated
3	Sarah Senica	"Can I Walk with You" (Jessica Simpson)	12	6	940	5	Eliminated
4	Gašper Rifelj	"Insieme: 1992" (Toto Cutugno)	7	8	1,246	2	Safe
5	Eva Boto	"Hero" (Mariah Carey)	27	2	1,051	4	Safe
6	Flora Ema Lotrič	"A Night like This" (Caro Emerald)	20	4	1,963	1	Safe
7	Barbara Vauda	"California King Bed" (Rihanna)	11	7	915	6	Eliminated
8	Eva and Nika Prusnik	"Satellite" (Lena Meyer-Landrut)	32	1	1,054	3	Safe

Show 6 – 6 November 2011
R/O	Artist	Song (Original artists)	Jury		Televote		Result
R/O	Artist	Song (Original artists)	Votes	Rank	Votes	Rank	Result
1	Brina Vidic	"I'm Like a Bird" (Nelly Furtado)	24	2	363	7	Safe
2	Manuela Brečko	"Fuckin' Perfect" (Pink)	28	1	690	4	Safe
3	Klemen Orter	"Empire State of Mind" (Jay-Z feat. Alicia Keys)	17	6	271	8	Eliminated
4	Sara Jagrič	"There You'll Be" (Faith Hill)	24	3	378	6	Eliminated
5	Nastja Gabor	"It's Raining Men" (Geri Halliwell)	13	7	732	5	Eliminated
6	David Matići	"Moja" (Toše Proeski)	6	8	915	3	Eliminated
7	Nadja Irgolič	"This Is Me" (Demi Lovato)	12	5	1,189	2	Safe
8	Nika Zorjan	"My Heart Will Go On" (Celine Dion)	20	4	1,443	1	Safe

Show 7 – 13 November 2011
R/O	Artist	Song (Original artists)	Points	Place	Result
1	Manuela Brečko	"Like a Prayer" (Madonna)	20	4	Safe
2	Flora Ema Lotrič	"Think Twice" (Celine Dion)	8	7	Bottom two
3	Gašper Rifelj	"All I Wanna Do Is Make Love to You" (Heart)	4	8	Bottom two
4	Eva and Nika Prusnik	"Gangsta's Paradise" (Coolio feat. L.V.)	26	2	Safe
5	Nika Zorjan	"Would I Lie to You?" (Charles & Eddie)	24	3	Safe
6	Nadja Irgolič	"Ironic" (Alanis Morissette)	15	6	Safe
7	Brina Vidic	"The Most Beautiful Girl In The World" (Prince)	18	5	Safe
8	Eva Boto	"Any Man of Mine" (Shania Twain)	29	1	Safe

Show 7 – Final Showdown
R/O	Artist	Song (Original artists)	Televote	Result
1	Flora Ema Lotrič	"Stuck" (Caro Emerald)	5,158	Saved
2	Gašper Rifelj	"Bed of Roses" (Bon Jovi)	2,671	Eliminated

Show 8 – 20 November 201
R/O	Artist	Song (Original artists)	Points	Place	Result
1	Nika Zorjan	"Ladadidej" (April)	17	3	Safe
2	Flora Ema Lotrič	"Malo tu, malo tam" (Neisha)	13	5	Safe
3	Nadja Irgolič	"Alya" (Alya)	7	7	Bottom two
4	Brina Vidic	"Moje luči" (Tabu)	12	6	Bottom two
5	Eva Boto	"Prisluhni mi" (Darja Švajger)	27	1	Safe
6	Manuela Brečko	"Dež" (Nina Pušlar)	17	3	Safe
7	Eva and Nika Prusnik	"Samo malo" (Magnifico and Turbolentza)	19	2	Safe

Show 8 – Final Showdown
R/O	Artist	Song (Original artists)	Televote	Result
1	Nadja Irgolič	"The Climb" (Miley Cyrus)	1,951	Eliminated
2	Brina Vidic	"You Know I'm No Good" (Amy Winehouse)	2,608	Saved

Show 9 – 27 November 2011
R/O	Artist	Song (Original artists)	Points	Place	Result
1	Flora Ema Lotrič	"Don't Stop the Music" (Rihanna)	8	6	Bottom two
2	Eva Boto	"Hush Hush" (The Pussycat Dolls feat. Nicole Scherzinger)	18	2	Safe
3	Brina Vidic	"Hung Up" (Madonna)	11	5	Bottom two
4	Eva and Nika Prusnik	"Tik Tok" (Kesha)	20	1	Safe
5	Nika Zorjan	"Bad Romance" (Lady Gaga)	13	4	Safe
6	Manuela Brečko	"One Love" (David Guetta feat. Estelle)	14	3	Safe

Show 9 – Final Showdown
R/O	Artist	Song (Original artists)	Televote	Result
1	Flora Ema Lotrič	"A Night like This" (Caro Emerald)	3,660	Saved
2	Brina Vidic	"I'm Like a Bird" (Nelly Furtado)	2,451	Eliminated

Show 10 – 11 December 2011
R/O	Artist	Song (Original artists)	Points	Place	Result
1	Flora Ema Lotrič	"I Love Rock 'n' Roll" (Britney Spears)	9	5	Bottom two
2	Manuela Brečko	"It's My Life" (No Doubt)	13	3	Safe
3	Eva Boto	"Whataya Want from Me" (Adam Lambert)	14	1	Safe
4	Nika Zorjan	"Sweet Child o' Mine" (Guns N' Roses)	10	4	Bottom two
5	Eva and Nika Prusnik	"It's My Life" (Bon Jovi)	14	1	Safe

Show 10 – Final showdown
R/O	Artist	Song (Original artists)	Televote	Result
1	Flora Ema Lotrič	"Malo tu, malo tam" (Neisha)	3,043	Eliminated
2	Nika Zorjan	"Ladadidej" (April)	3,834	Saved

==== Semi-final ====
The semi-final of Misija Evrovizija took place on 18 December 2011. A public televote selected two contestants up for eviction, with one of them being saved by the judges.

Semi-final – 18 December 2011
R/O	Artist	First song (Original artists)	Second song (Original artists)	Televote	Place	Result
1	Nika Zorjan	"My Life Would Suck Without You" (Kelly Clarkson)	"Unfaithful" (Rihanna)	6,101	2	Safe
2	Eva and Nika Prusnik	"Bubbly" (Colbie Caillat)	"Forget You" (CeeLo Green)	1,739	4	Bottom two
3	Manuela Brečko	"Hey, Soul Sister" (Train)	"Someone like You" (Adele)	1,995	3	Bottom two
4	Eva Boto	"Use Somebody" (Kings of Leon)	"Flashdance... What a Feeling" (Irene Cara)	7,024	1	Safe

Semi-final – Final Showdown
R/O	Artist	Song (Original artists)	Points	Result
1	Eva and Nika Prusnik	"Je veux" (Zaz)	3	Saved
2	Manuela Brečko	"Something in the Water" (Brooke Fraser)	1	Eliminated

==== Final ====
The final of Misija Evrovizija took place on 8 January 2012. The remaining three contestants first faced a public televote where one proceeded to Misija EMA 2012. An additional qualifier was ten selected by the judges out of the remaining two contestants.

Selected by the public vote Selected by the jury

Final – 8 January 2012
R/O	Artist	Song 1 (Original artists)	Song 2 (Original artists)	Jury		Televote		Result
R/O	Artist	Song 1 (Original artists)	Song 2 (Original artists)	Votes	Rank	Votes	Rank	Result
1	Nika Zorjan	"Listen" (Beyoncé)	"Ne partez pas sans moi" (Céline Dion)	6	3	16,896	2	Eliminated
2	Eva and Nika Prusnik	"Samo malo" (Magnifico and Turbolentza)	"Wild Dances" (Ruslana)	9	1	6,628	3	Advanced
3	Eva Boto	"Because of You" (Kelly Clarkson)	"Running Scared" (Ell and Nikki)	9	1	17,045	1	Advanced

=== Misija 2012 ===
Misija 2012 aired on 31 December 2011. The top eight contestants of Misija Evrovizija and former EMA contestants performed during the show.

Misija 2012 – 31 December 2011
R/O	Artist	Song
1	Manuela Brečko	"Take Me to Your Heaven"
2	Alya	"Vse manj je dobrih gostiln"
3	Gašper Rifelj	"Naj bogovi slišijo"
4	Eva Boto	"Marija Magdalena"
5	Nina Pušlar	"Pozdrav z ljubeznijo"
6	Nadja Irgolič	"Lep poletni dan"
7	Maja Keuc	"Ta čas"
8	Brina Vidic	"Satellite"
9	Neisha feat. Tokac	"Najin ples"
10	Flora Ema Lotrič	"Hajde da ludujemo"
11	Tangels	"Najin"/"Kaj in kam"/"To je moj dan" (feat. Kataya)
12	Eva and Nika Prusnik	"Samo ljubezen"
13	Nika Zorjan and Langa	"Zaigraj muzikant"
14	Štirje Kovači, Cita Galič and Klemen	"Kam le čas beži"

=== Misija EMA 2012 ===
Misija EMA 2012 was second phase of the 17th edition of the Slovenian national final format Evrovizijska Melodija (EMA), used by RTV Slovenija to select Slovenia's entry for the Eurovision Song Contest 2012. The competition took place at the RTV Slovenija Studio 1 in Ljubljana, hosted by Klemen Slakonja and 2011 Slovenian Eurovision entrant Maja Keuc and was broadcast on TV SLO 1, Radio Val 202, Radio Maribor and online via the broadcaster's website rtvslo.si as well as the official Eurovision Song Contest website eurovision.tv.

==== Format ====
The two qualifiers of Misija Evrovizija, Eva Boto and Eva and Nika Prusnik, competed in a televised show where they each performed three potential Eurovision songs and the winner was selected over two rounds of voting. In the first round, the 50/50 combination of points from a four-member expert jury and a public televote selected one song per artist to proceed to a superfinal. For each artist, the expert jury and the televote each assigned scores as follows: 1, 3 and 5, with the results being determined when the votes were combined. Ties were broken by giving priority to the song that achieved the highest score from the jury. In the superfinal, public televoting exclusively determined the winner. In case of technical problems with the televote, the jury would have voted to determine the winner by having each juror indicating their preferred song.

==== Competing entries ====
Composers were able to submit their songs to the broadcaster between 12 January 2012 and 26 January 2012. 52 songs were received by the broadcaster during the submission period. A total of six songs were selected for the competition, three by an expert committee consisting of Darja Švajger (1995 and 1999 Slovenian Eurovision entrant), Aleksander Radić (Head of the Slovenian delegation at the Eurovision Song Contest) and Mojca Menart (Head of ZKP RTV Slovenija) from the received submissions and three written by composers nominated by the entertainment programme of RTV Slovenija and directly invited by the broadcaster. Eva Boto and Eva and Nika Prusnik were each allocated three of the songs and the competing songs were announced on 16 February 2012.

Artist	Song	Songwriter(s)
Eva Boto	"A si sanjal me"	Matjaž Vlašič, Urša Vlašič
Eva Boto	"Run"	Christina Schilling, Camilla Gottschalck, Henrik Szabo, Daniel Nillson, Søren Bundgaard
Eva Boto	"Verjamem"	Vladimir Graić, Igor Pirkovič
Eva and Nika Prusnik	"Konichiwa" (コニチワ)	Maja Pihler Stermecki, Gregor Stermecki
Eva and Nika Prusnik	"Love Hurts"	Chiron Morpheus
Eva and Nika Prusnik	"Malo sreče"	Robert Pešut, Barbara Pešut

==== Final ====
Misija EMA 2012 took place on 26 February 2012. In addition to the performances of the competing entries, the top eight contestants of Misija Evrovizija: Nika Zorjan, Manuela Brečko, Brina Vidic, Nadja Irgolič, Flora Ema Lotrič and Gašper Rifelj, Zlatko, 2012 French Eurovision entrant Anggun and 1989 Eurovision winner Emilija Kokić performed as guests. The winner was selected over two rounds of voting. In the first round, one song per artist proceeded to the second round based on the combination of points from a four-member jury panel and a public televote. The jury consisted of the judges of Misija Evrovizija: Darja Švajger, Jonas Žnidaršič, Raay and Tina Marinšek. In the second round, a public televote selected "Verjamem" performed by Eva Boto as the winner.

Final – 26 February 2012
R/O	Artist	Song	Jury		Televote		Total	Result
R/O	Artist	Song	Votes	Points	Votes	Points	Total	Result
1	Eva Boto	"Run"	10	3	2,282	1	4	—N/a
2	Eva and Nika Prusnik	"Konichiwa"	20	5	3,691	5	10	Advanced
3	Eva Boto	"A si sanjal me"	8	1	2,909	3	4	—N/a
4	Eva and Nika Prusnik	"Malo sreče"	10	3	517	1	4	—N/a
5	Eva Boto	"Verjamem"	18	5	8,772	5	10	Advanced
6	Eva and Nika Prusnik	"Love Hurts"	6	1	715	3	4	—N/a

Superfinal – 26 February 2012
R/O	Artist	Song	Televote	Place
1	Eva Boto	"Verjamem"	28,385	1
2	Eva and Nika Prusnik	"Konichiwa"	12,884	2

=== Promotion ===
Eva Boto made several appearances across Europe to specifically promote "Verjamem" as the Slovenian Eurovision entry. On 19 March, Eva Boto appeared in and performed during the RTV Pink programme Ami G Show in Serbia. On 21 April, Boto performed during the Eurovision in Concert event which was held at the Melkweg venue in Amsterdam, Netherlands and hosted by Cornald Maas and Ruth Jacott. On 23 April, Boto performed during the London Eurovision Party, which was held at the Shadow Lounge venue in London, United Kingdom and hosted by Nicki French and Paddy O'Connell. On 26 April, Boto appeared during the HRT 1 morning show Dobro jutro, Hrvatska in Croatia. On 10 May, Boto appeared during the BHT 1 programme Sve u svemu in Bosnia and Herzegovina.

== At Eurovision ==
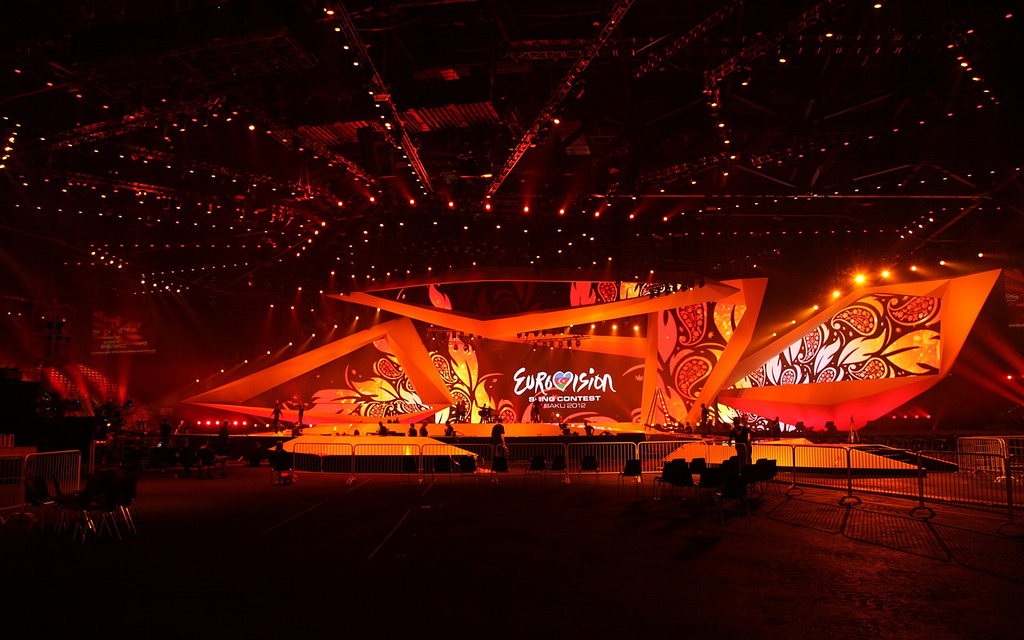
The Eurovision Song Contest 2012 took place at the Baku Crystal Hall in Baku, Azerbaijan

According to Eurovision rules, all nations with the exceptions of the host country and the "Big Five" (France, Germany, Italy, Spain and the United Kingdom) are required to qualify from one of two semi-finals in order to compete for the final; the top ten countries from each semi-final progress to the final. The European Broadcasting Union (EBU) split up the competing countries into six different pots based on voting patterns from previous contests, with countries with favourable voting histories put into the same pot. On 25 January 2012, an allocation draw was held which placed each country into one of the two semi-finals, as well as which half of the show they would perform in. Slovenia was placed into the second semi-final, to be held on 24 May 2012, and was scheduled to perform in the second half of the show. The running order for the semi-finals was decided through another draw on 20 March 2012 and Slovenia was set to perform in position 9, following the entry from Bulgaria and before the entry from Croatia.

In Slovenia, the semi-finals were televised on TV SLO 2 and the final was televised on TV SLO 1. All shows featured commentary by Andrej Hofer. The Slovenian spokesperson, who announced the Slovenian votes during the final, was Lorella Flego.

=== Semi-final ===
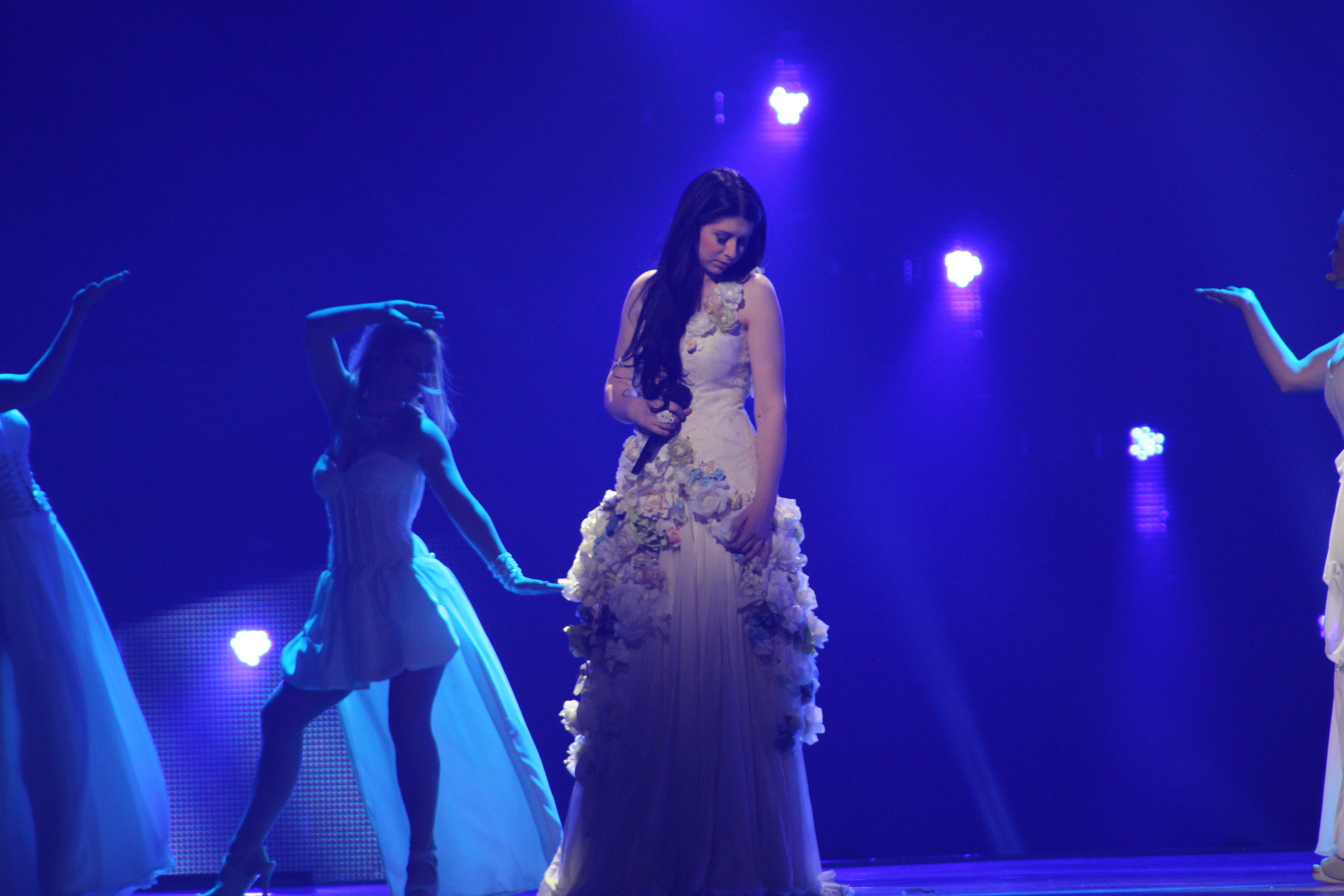
Eva Boto during a rehearsal before the second semi-final

Eva Boto took in technical rehearsals on 16 and 19 May, followed by dress rehearsals on 23 and 24 May. This included the jury show on 23 May where the professional juries of each country watched and voted on the competing entries.

The Slovenian performance featured Eva Boto performing in a long white dress attached with a flower decoration together with five backing vocalists who also wore long white dresses. The stage colours transitioned from blue to gold as the song progressed, and the LED screens displayed blue waving cloth which changed to golden bubbles in the middle of the performance. The Slovenian performance was choreographed by Matic Zadravec from the Maestro Dance Studio. The five backing vocalists that joined Eva Boto on stage were: Ana Bezjak, Katja Koren, Martina Majerle, Mateja Majerle and Sandra Feketija. Majerle previously represented Slovenia in the Eurovision Song Contest 2009 together with the group Quartissimo where they failed to qualify to the grand final of the contest with the song "Love Symphony".

At the end of the show, Slovenia was not announced among the top 10 entries in the second semi-final and therefore failed to qualify to compete in the final. It was later revealed that Slovenia placed seventeenth in the semi-final, receiving a total of 31 points.

=== Voting ===
Voting during the three shows involved each country awarding points from 1-8, 10 and 12 as determined by a combination of 50% national jury and 50% televoting. Each nation's jury consisted of five music industry professionals who are citizens of the country they represent. This jury judged each entry based on: vocal capacity; the stage performance; the song's composition and originality; and the overall impression by the act. In addition, no member of a national jury was permitted to be related in any way to any of the competing acts in such a way that they cannot vote impartially and independently.

Following the release of the full split voting by the EBU after the conclusion of the competition, it was revealed that Slovenia had placed sixteenth with the public televote and fourteenth with the jury vote in the second semi-final. In the public vote, Slovenia scored 27 points, while with the jury vote, Slovenia scored 40 points.

Below is a breakdown of points awarded to Slovenia and awarded by Slovenia in the second semi-final and grand final of the contest. The nation awarded its 12 points to Serbia in the semi-final and the final of the contest.

==== Points awarded to Slovenia ====
Points awarded to Slovenia (Semi-final 2)
Score	Country
12 points	
10 points	Serbia
8 points	Croatia
7 points	
6 points	
5 points	Bosnia and Herzegovina
4 points	Germany; Macedonia
3 points	
2 points	
1 point	

==== Points awarded by Slovenia ====
Points awarded by Slovenia (Semi-final 2)
Score	Country
12 points	Serbia
10 points	Sweden
8 points	Croatia
7 points	Lithuania
6 points	Macedonia
5 points	Bosnia and Herzegovina
4 points	Malta
3 points	Portugal
2 points	Netherlands
1 point	Estonia

Points awarded by Slovenia (Final)
Score	Country
12 points	Serbia
10 points	Sweden
8 points	Russia
7 points	Bosnia and Herzegovina
6 points	Macedonia
5 points	Italy
4 points	Iceland
3 points	Albania
2 points	Germany
1 point	Moldova

==== Jury Points awarded by Slovenia ====
Jury points awarded by Slovenia (semi-final 2)
Score	Country
12 points	Sweden
10 points	Serbia
8 points	Croatia
7 points	Lithuania
6 points	Malta
5 points	Portugal
4 points	Norway
3 points	Georgia
2 points	Turkey
1 point	Estonia

Jury points awarded by Slovenia (final)
Score	Country
12 points	Sweden
10 points	Serbia
8 points	Italy
7 points	Iceland
6 points	Bosnia and Herzegovina
5 points	Moldova
4 points	Russia
3 points	Germany
2 points	Cyprus
1 point	Spain
