= Tinkara Kovač =

Slovenian singer and musician (born 1978)

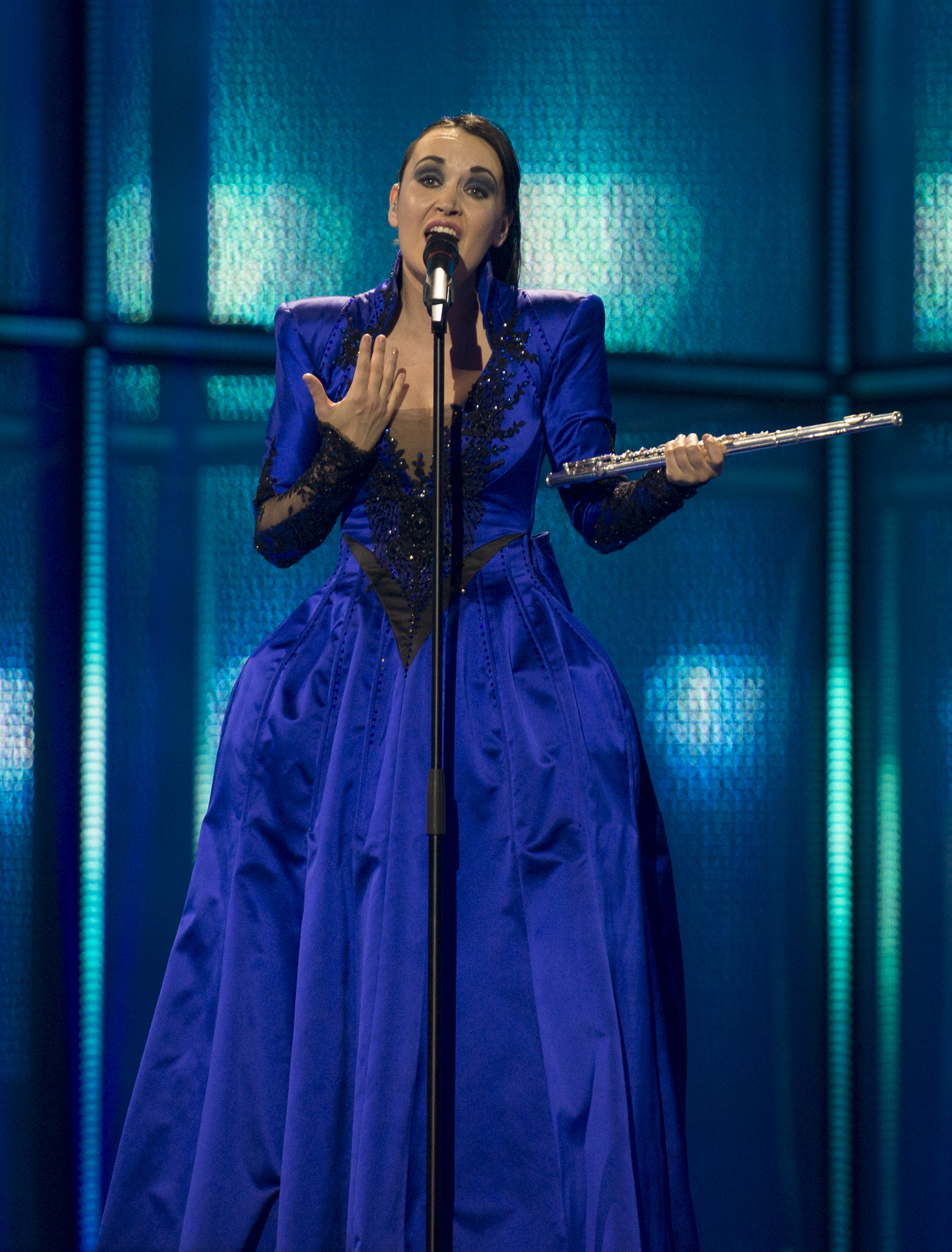
- Tinkara Kovač (2014)

Background information
- Born: Tinkara Kovač; 3 September 1978 (age 47); Koper, SR Slovenia, SFR Yugoslavia
- Genres: Pop, rock
- Occupations: Singer, flautist
- Years active: 1997–present
- Website: http://www.tinkara.net

Tinkara Kovač presenting herself on Eurosong 2014.

Tinkara Kovač (born 3 September 1978) is a Slovenian singer and flautist. She represented her country in the Eurovision Song Contest 2014 in Copenhagen, finishing in 25th place.

== Career ==
=== Career in general ===
Her professional career as a singer started in 1997, when she won "Most promising singer award" at the Portorož festival. Her appearance was encouraged by known local composer Danilo Kocjančič, which together with lyrics writer Drago Mislej – Mef and Marino Legovič wrote the winning song and later the whole material for her first album.

In 2004, at the time of her fourth concert in Ljubljana's Cankar Centre, she invited Ian Anderson (singer of the group Jethro Tull), which greatly contributed to her decision to start playing flute. At Anderson's reverse invitation she participated as a guest during the band's tour in Croatia, Italy, Austria and Germany. Later she sang also with Robert Plant of Led Zeppelin and other musicians, like Carlos Núñez Muñoz, Dan Lavery, Massimo Bubola, Bungaro and Paul Millns. Her musical influences are U2, KT Tunstall, Imogen Heap, Pink Floyd, Coldplay and Jethro Tull.

=== Eurovision Song Contest ===
Kovač had made three previous attempts to represent Slovenia. In Slovenia's 1999 national final, she won the televote but finished second after the jury vote was given. She also finished fifth in 2001 and 10th in 1997. She later attempted to represent Slovenia in 2020, and finished fourth in the national final.

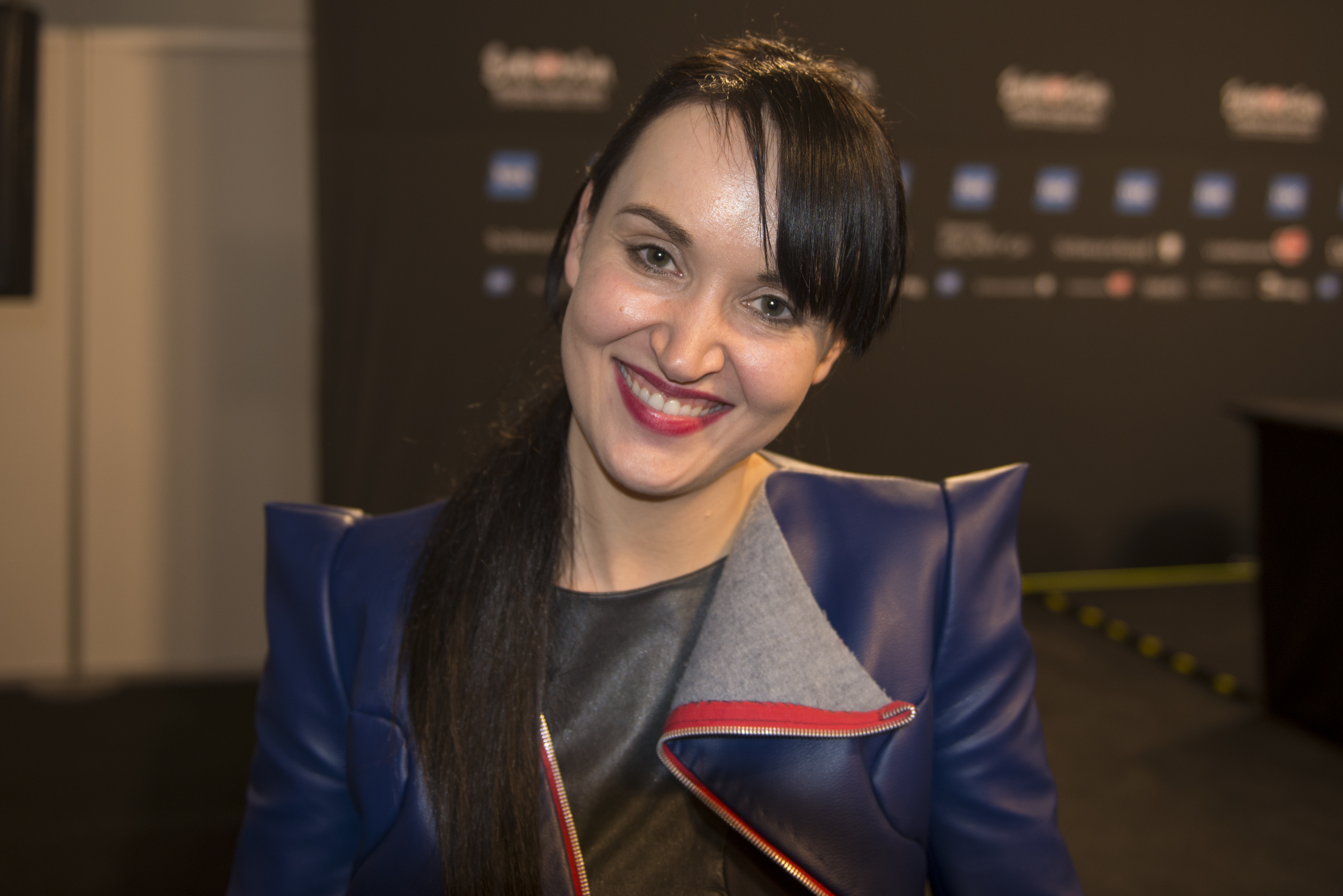
Tinkara Kovač, 2014

- 1997: Veter z juga (Danilo Kocjančič - Drago Mislej - Marino Legovič) – 10th (574 televotes)
- 1999: Zakaj (Marino Legovič - Drago Mislej - Marino Legovič) – 2nd (62 points)
- 2001: Sonce v očeh (Tinkara Kovač, Sergej Pobegajlo - Zvezdan Martič - Sergej Pobegajlo) – 4th (18 points)
- 2014: Spet/Round and Round (Raay - Tinkara Kovač, Hannah Mancini, Tina Piš - Raay) – 1st (7.932 televotes)
- 2020: Forever (Aleš Klinar - Anja Rupel - Miha Gorše) – 4th

On 8 March 2014, Kovač was announced as the winner of Slovenian selection, EMA 2014 with her bilingual song "Spet/Round and Round" meaning she will represent Slovenia in the Eurovision Song Contest 2014 in Copenhagen, Denmark. The song was written by Kovač, Raay, Tina Piš, and the Slovene representative in the Eurovision Song Contest 2013, Hannah Mancini. She managed to get into final evening and finished 25th out of 26.

=== Slovenian song festival 1998 ===
She participated with the song "Moški in ženska" ("Man and Woman").

== Singles ==
- 1993: "Odločitev"
- 1995: "Moje flavte nežni zvok"
- 1997: "Veter z juga"
- 1997: "Ne odhaja poletje"
- 1998: "Moški in ženska"
- 1999: "Zakaj"
- 2001: "Sonce v očeh"
- 2003: "Reason Why"
- 2005: "Spezzacuori"
- 2009: "Če je to vse"
- 2012: "Je to res"
- 2013: "Mars in Venera"
- 2014: "Spet" / "Round and Round"
- 2014: "2X2"
- 2014: "Cuori di ossigeno"
- 2015: "Ocean"
- 2015: "Canzone per te" / "Pesem zate" (with Perpetuum Jazzile)
- 2020: "Forever"

== Discography ==
- Ne odhaja poletje (1997)
- Košček neba (1999)
- Na robu kroga (2001)
- O-range (2003)
- Enigma (2004)
- aQa (2007)
- The Best of Tinkara (2009)
- Rastemo (2012)
- Zazibanke (2013)
- Round and round/Spet (2014)

== Personal life ==
Kovač achieved formal music education as a professor with a degree in flute playing at the Giuseppe Tartini conservatory in Trieste. She lives near the Karst Plateau together with her partner and two daughters. She is of partial Hungarian ancestry.

Awards and achievements
Preceded by Hannah Mancini with "Straight into Love"	Slovenia in the Eurovision Song Contest; 2014	Succeeded by Maraaya with "Here for You"
