= Petanjci =

Petanjci Petajnci
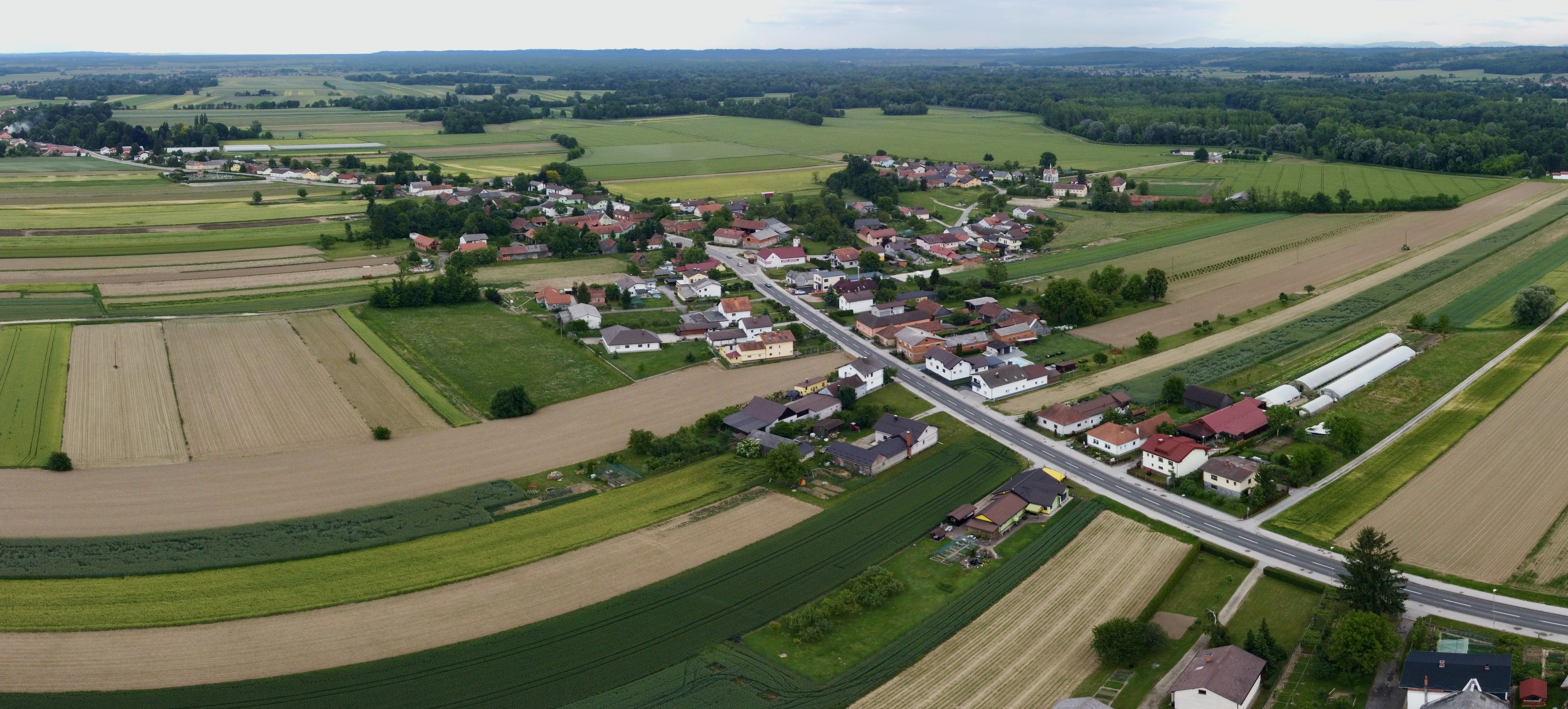

- Location in Slovenia
- Coordinates: 46°39′2.23″N 16°4′40.3″E
- Country: Slovenia
- Traditional region: Prekmurje
- Statistical region: Mura
- Municipality: Tišina

Area
  - Total: 7.64 km^{2} (2.95 sq mi)
- Elevation: 196 m (643 ft)

Population (2002)
  - Total: 676

Petanjci (pronounced [pɛˈtaːntsi]; Hungarian: Szécsénykút, Prekmurje Slovene: Petajnci) is a village on the left bank of the Mura River in the Municipality of Tišina in the Prekmurje region of northeastern Slovenia.

There is a small chapel in the village. It is dedicated to Saint Florian and was built in the early 20th century in the Neo-Gothic style.

== Notable residents ==
- Johannes Kepler (1571–1630), astronomer, mathematician, and astrologer. In 1598, he spent a month at former Kastelišče Castle (Nádasdy Mansion), where as a Protestant he found refuge from Catholic persecution.
- Nika Zorjan (born 1992), singer and songwriter
