= Standing Still (Roman Lob song) =

2012 debut single by Roman Lob

Single by Roman Lob

from the album Changes
- Released: 16 February 2012
- Length: 3:25
- Label: USFB; Universal
- Songwriters: Jamie Cullum; Steve Robson; Wayne Hector
- Producers: Bertil Mark; Michael "Mitch" Dörfler

Roman Lob singles chronology
"Standing Still" (2012)	"Call Out the Sun" (2012)

Eurovision Song Contest 2012 entry
- Country: Germany
- Artist: Roman Lob
- Language: English
- Composers: Jamie Cullum; Steve Robson; Wayne Hector
- Lyricists: Jamie Cullum; Steve Robson; Wayne Hector

Finals performance
- Final result: 8th
- Final points: 110

Entry chronology
- ◄ "Taken by a Stranger" (2011)
- "Glorious" (2013) ►

"Standing Still" is a song performed by German singer Roman Lob. Written by British musicians Jamie Cullum, Steve Robson, and Wayne Hector, it served as the German entry at the Eurovision Song Contest 2012 in Baku, where it finished in 8th place. The song was released digitally in Germany on 16 February 2012 as a track on Lob's debut studio album Changes. "Standing Still" was certified gold by the Bundesverband Musikindustrie (BVMI) for domestic shipments exceeding 150,000.

== Eurovision Song Contest ==
As a member of the "Big Five," Germany automatically qualified to compete in the final of the Eurovision Song Contest 2012 on 26 May 2012. Lob took part in technical rehearsals on 19 and 20 May, followed by dress rehearsals on 25 and 26 May. The running order for the semi-finals and final was decided by through another draw on 20 March 2012, and as one of the five wildcard countries, Germany chose to perform in position 20, following the entry from Spain and before the entry from Malta.

The German performance saw Lob performing on stage in a white cap and a dark open shirt with a white t-shirt inside with two guitarists, a drummer and a pianist. The stage colours were dark with white spotlights and the LED screens displayed a dark background that transitioned from single moving red dots to white lights towards the end of the song which created a starry sky effect. The four musicians that joined Lob on stage were Alexander Linster, Marc Awounou, Thomas Fietz and Tobias Schmitz.

Germany eventually placed eighth in the final, scoring 110 points. Following the release of the full split voting by the EBU after the conclusion of the competition, it was revealed that Lob had placed sixth with the public televote and tenth with the jury vote. In the public vote, he scored 125 points and in the jury vote the nation scored 98 points. Lob's placing was Germany's third top ten placement in a row but would remain the country's last entry to achieve a top ten result in the contest until Michael Schulte's "You Let Me Walk Alone" in 2018.

== Track listings ==
Digital download
No.	Title	Writer(s)	Producer(s)	Length
1.	"Standing Still"	Jamie Cullum; Steve Robson; Wayne Hector	Bertil Mark; Michael "Mitch" Dörfler	3:25

3-track CD single
No.	Title	Writer(s)	Producer(s)	Length
1.	"Conflicted"	Martin Mulholland	Brix; Mathias Ramson	3:47
2.	"Standing Still"	Cullum; Robson; Hector	Mark; Dörfler	3:25
3.	"Alone"	Emanuel Kiriakou; Gary Go	Thorsten Brötzmann	3:29

== Charts ==
=== Weekly charts ===
Weekly chart performance for "Standing Still"
Chart (2012)	Peak positions
Austria (Ö3 Austria Top 40)	40
Belgium (Ultratip Bubbling Under Flanders)	48
Belgium (Ultratip Bubbling Under Wallonia)	39
Germany (Media Control AG)	3
Ireland (IRMA)	67
Switzerland (Schweizer Hitparade)	51
UK Singles Chart (Official Charts Company)	132

=== Year-end charts ===
Year-end chart performance for "Standing Still"
Chart (2012)	Peak position
Germany (Media Control AG)	72

== Certifications ==
Certifications for "Standing Still"
Region	Certification	Certified units/sales
Germany (BVMI)	Gold	150,000^{^}
^{^} Shipments figures based on certification alone.

== Release history ==
Release dates and formats for "Standing Still"
Region	Date	Label	Format	Ref.
Germany	16 February 2012	Universal Music	Digital download	
Germany	21 February 2012	Universal Music	3-track-CD single	
