= Hannah Mancini =

American singer

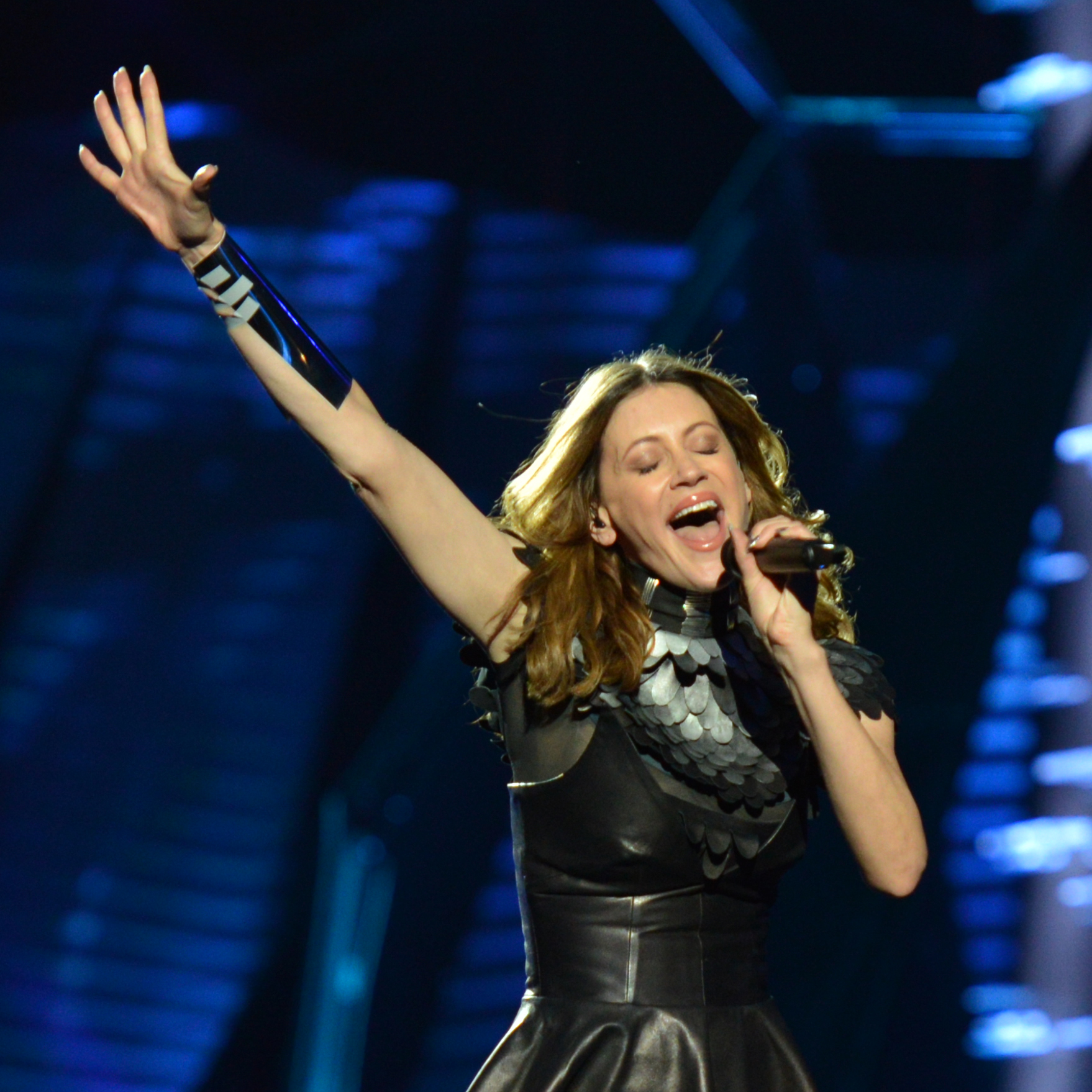
- Hannah Mancini performing the song Straight Into Love in the Eurovision Song Contest 2013.

Background information
- Also known as: Hannah; Stella Mercury
- Born: Hannah Leah Mancini; January 22, 1980 (age 46); Fresno, California, U.S.
- Origin: Slovenia
- Genres: Dance-pop; dubstep; nu-disco; electronic
- Occupations: Singer; songwriter
- Instrument: Vocals

Hannah Leah Mancini (born 22 January 1980), also known as Stella Mercury or simply Hannah, is an American singer and songwriter who works and lives in Slovenia. She has been heavily involved in dance, nu disco and electronic scenes there and worked with artists and producers in these genres. Hannah's first music industry experiences had her on multiple soundtracks for Disney films and the opportunity to collaborate with Grammy winning producer, Larry Klein. She also performed at Radio City Music Hall, Universal Amphitheatre and on The Tonight Show with Jay Leno.

Mancini was the Slovene representative in the Eurovision Song Contest 2013 in Malmö, Sweden and co-wrote the Slovene entry, "Round and Round" in the Eurovision Song Contest 2014 in Copenhagen, Denmark.

== Career ==
=== 2009–2013: Early career ===
Being a singer and songwriter, she's lent her efforts and collaborated on projects with Grammy winning producer, Larry Klein, top international DJ, Umek (Vice Grip; Circle Records 2009, Dementia; Hell Yeah Records 2009), DJ/Producer Sare Havlicek (3 singles off album, Toscana Nights – Nang Records 2010), one single from Sare's current album (Vibe on You: Nang Records 2011) and from the Russian electronic band, D-Pulse, their 2010 release, (Highway to Saturn, Nang 2010). She has also performed as the front singer in the nationally successful band, XEQUTIFZ for the last 4 years, which has yielded 3 radio hits, She recorded XEQUTIFZ songs in both Slovene and English versions. ('Anywhere With You'/'Dalec Stran' in 2009 and 'And We Danced'/'Bil je Ples' in 2010, and Walking Away in 2011). The music video released for the single, And We Danced, reached the #3 position on MTV Adria. Hannah also has current releases with Beltek (Connect Us, High Contrast Recordings, February 2013) and David Puentez, Kosta Radman and Vanillaz with their single (Back2Life, Tiger Records) the single was placed on a popular house compilation by top house label, Kontor Records (May 2013). More recently, Hannah developed the moniker, Stella Mercury, for more underground, less commercial dance releases. The first single released under Stella Mercury is a collaboration with Mike Vale ('Don't Give a Damn', Stealth Records) which was released in May 2013 and stayed on the Beatport house chart Top 10 for 3 months.

=== 2013–present: Eurovision Song Contest ===
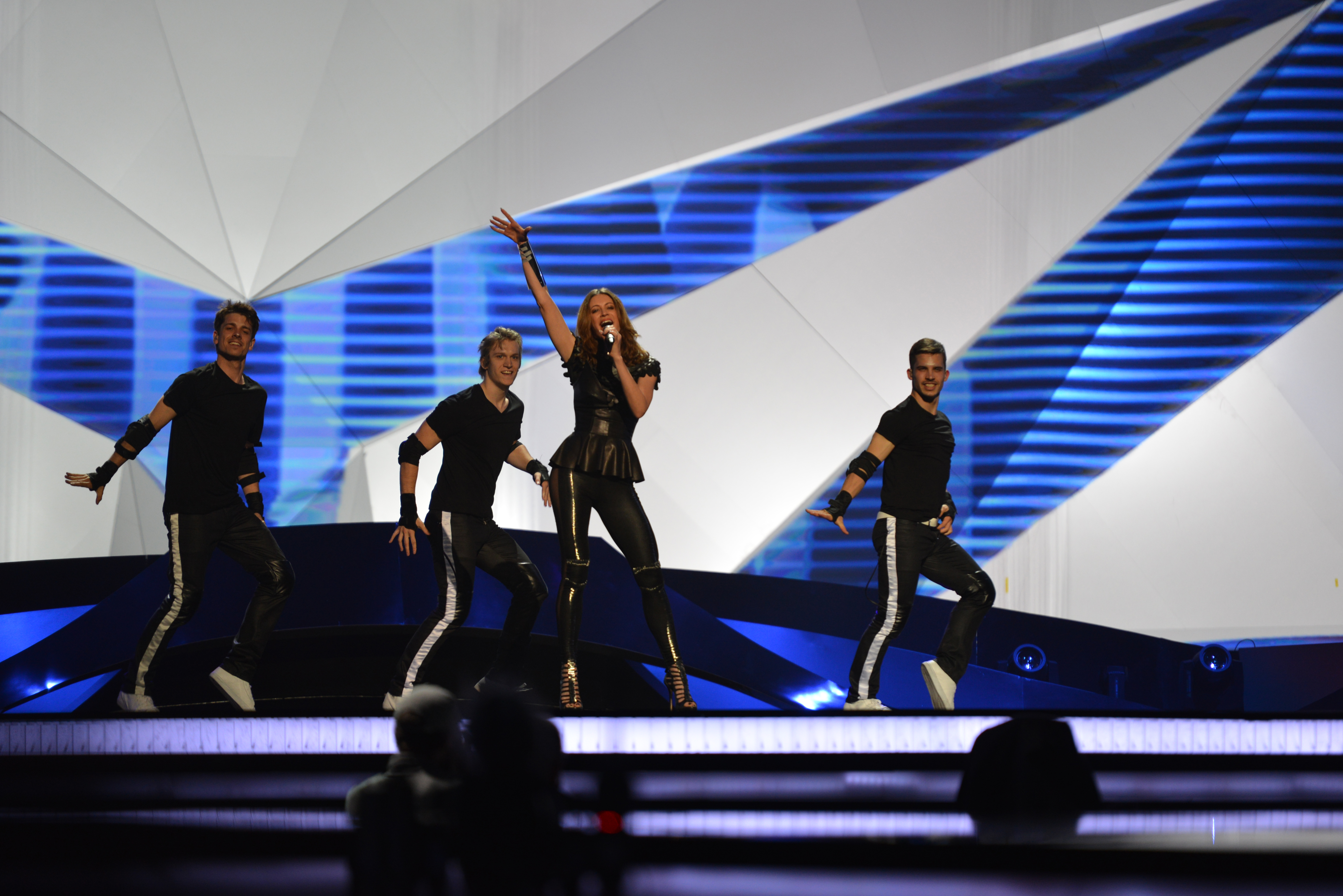
Hannah performing at the Eurovision 2013 Semi-Final.

Hannah was asked to represent Slovenia in Eurovision 2013. Before that, together with Sylvain and Mike Vale, she took part in the Slovenian national final for the Eurovision Song Contest 2011 with the song Ti si tisti. It did not win the contest, but became a national hit. She was internally selected between several other singers/songs to represent Slovenia in the Eurovision Song Contest 2013 in Malmö with the song "Straight Into Love". On the 14th of May, 2013, Hannah placed 16th (last) in Semi-final 1 with 8 points. The song, an EDM track, was later remixed by DJ/producer Denis Goldin released on Lovenest Records and also deep house DJ duo, WD2N. Currently Hannah is working with WD2N on a project in that genre. Mancini co-wrote the Slovene entry in the Eurovision Song Contest 2014, "Spet/Round and Round", performed by Tinkara Kovač. That song did manage to get through to the final and placed 25th out of 26 countries.

== Personal life ==
Currently, Mancini is married and has a daughter, Astrid. She has a sister-in-law named Karin.

Awards and achievements
Preceded by Eva Boto with "Verjamem"	Slovenia in the Eurovision Song Contest; 2013	Succeeded by Tinkara Kovač with "Spet/Round and Round"
