= Roman Lob =

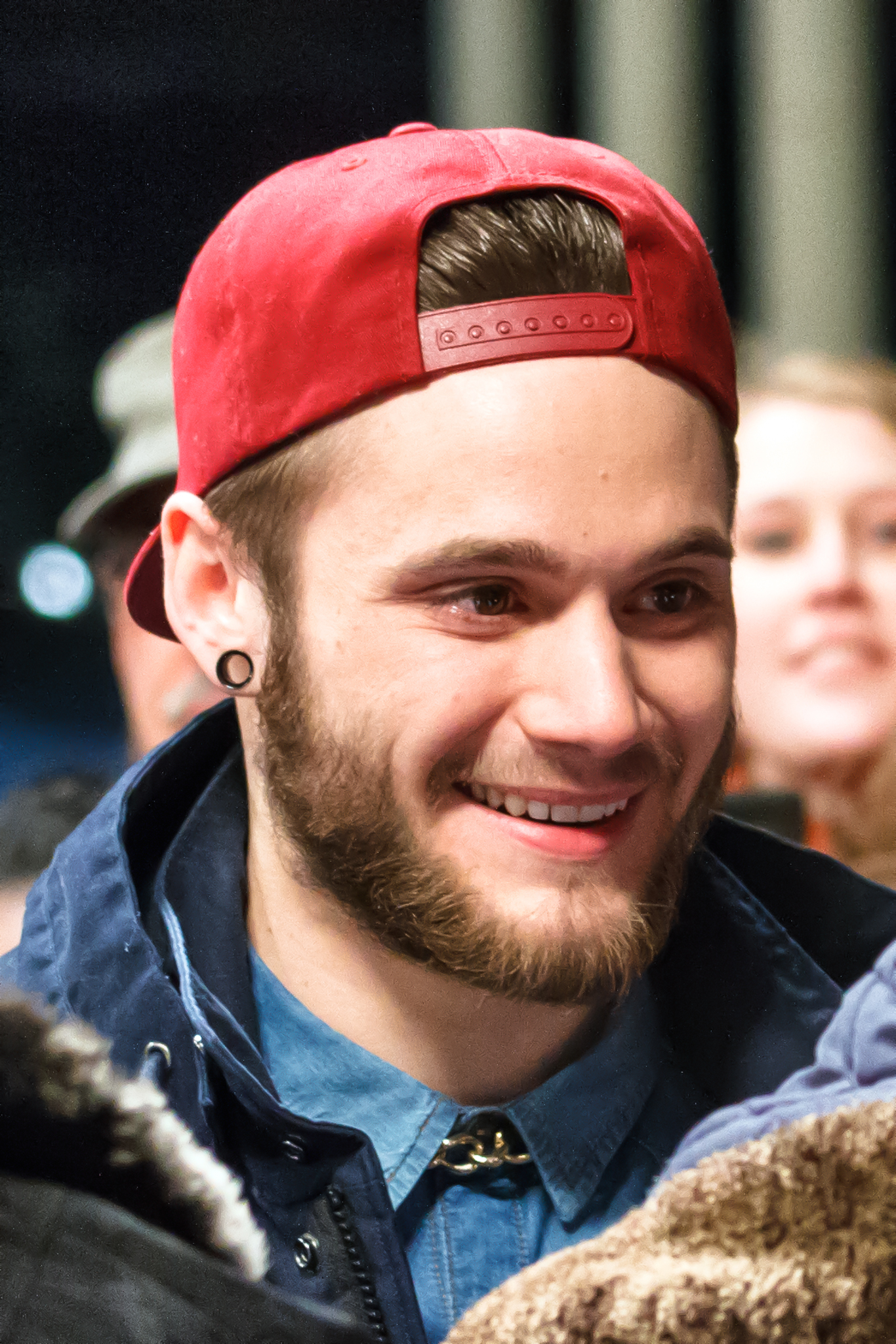
- Roman Lob at the Echo music award 2013

Background information
- Born: 2 July 1990 (age 35)
- Origin: Düsseldorf, West Germany
- Genres: Pop, pop rock, rock, alternative pop
- Occupations: Singer, songwriter
- Labels: USFB, Universal
- Website: www.romanlob.de

Roman Lob (born 2 July 1990) is a German singer-songwriter. In early 2012, Lob was a contestant in the German TV show Unser Star für Baku, produced by the German broadcasting stations Pro7 and Das Erste. He is also the lead singer of the band Rooftop Kingdom, an alternative rock band with origins in Neustadt (Wied). He was also a founding member of German Metalcore band, Days of Despite.

== Career ==
=== 2007–2011: Early beginnings ===
In 2007, Lob took part in the fourth series of the German Idol format Deutschland sucht den Superstar but had to quit due to a vocal cord infection. He had already advanced into the field of the top 20 contestants.

In 2008, Roman took part in the competition to represent Germany at the Eurovision Song Contest 2008 in Belgrade, as a part of the boy band G12P – Germany 12 Points. The song "When the Boys Come" was ultimately not chosen to compete in the national final.

=== 2012–present: Eurovision Song Contest 2012 ===
On 16 February 2012, he won the show Unser Star für Baku and represented Germany in the Eurovision Song Contest 2012. He achieved eighth place with 110 points in the contest.

== Personal life ==
Along with his sister, Lob grew up in Rott, a district of Neustadt (Wied). After high school, he trained as an industrial mechanic at an auto parts supplier in Troisdorf until January 2011. Lob loves to spend his free time snowboarding and downhill. Because of his love of music, he has a microphone tattoo on his chest.

== Discography ==
=== Albums ===
Title	Details	Peak chart positions		
Title	Details	GER	AUT	SWI
Changes	Released: 13 April 2012; Label: Universal Records; Formats: CD, digital download	9	50	81
Home	Released: 25 July 2014; Label: TBA; Formats: CD, digital download	—	—	—
Acoustic Session 1.	Released: 3 April 2015; Label: Manuscript; Formats: CD, digital download	—	—	—
"—" denotes a recording that did not chart or was not released.

=== Singles ===
Title	Year	Peak chart positions				Album
Title	Year	GER	AUT	SWI	UK	Album
"Standing Still"	2012	3	40	51	132	Changes
"Call Out the Sun"	2012	—	—	—	—	Changes
"All That Matters"	2014	—	—	—	—	Home
"Jealous"	2015	—	—	—	—	Non-album singles
"Ain't Nobody"	2015	—	—	—	—	Non-album singles
"—" denotes a recording that did not chart or was not released.

=== Other charted songs ===
Title	Year	Peak chart positions	Album
Title	Year	GER	Album
"Conflicted"	2012	51	Changes
"Alone"	2012	42	Changes

Awards and achievements
Preceded by Lena with "Taken by a Stranger"	Germany in the Eurovision Song Contest; 2012	Succeeded by Cascada with "Glorious"
