= Germany in the Eurovision Song Contest 2012 =

- Eurovision Song Contest 2012
- Participating broadcaster: ARD (Note: Arbeitsgemeinschaft der öffentlich-rechtlichen Rundfunkanstalten der Bundesrepublik Deutschland) – Norddeutscher Rundfunk (NDR)
- Country: Germany
- Selection process: Unser Star für Baku
- Selection date: 16 February 2012

Competing entry
- Song: "Standing Still"
- Artist: Roman Lob
- Songwriters: Jamie Cullum; Steve Robson; Wayne Hector

Placement
- Final result: 8th, 110 points

Participation chronology

Germany was represented at the Eurovision Song Contest 2012 with the song "Standing Still" written by Steve Robson, Jamie Cullum and Wayne Hector, and performed by Roman Lob. The German participating broadcaster on behalf of ARD, Norddeutscher Rundfunk (NDR), organised the national final Unser Star für Baku in order to select their entry for the contest in collaboration with private broadcaster ProSieben. The national final featured 20 competing artists and consisted of five heats, a quarter-final, a semi-final and a final held in January and February 2012 2012. Contestants were selected to advance in the competition via public televote. Two contestants qualified to compete in the final where the winner was selected over two rounds of voting. "Standing Still" performed by Roman Lob was selected as the German entry for Baku after gaining 50.7% of the votes in the second round.

As a member of the "Big Five", Germany automatically qualified to compete in the final of the Eurovision Song Contest. Performing in position 20, Germany placed eighth out of the 26 participating countries with 110 points.

== Background ==
Prior to the 2012 contest, ARD had participated in the Eurovision Song Contest representing Germany fifty-five times since its debut in the inaugural contest. Germany has won the contest on two occasions: in 1982 with the song "Ein bißchen Frieden" performed by Nicole and in 2010 with the song "Satellite" performed by Lena. Germany, to this point, has been noted for having competed in the contest more than any other country; they have competed in every contest since the first edition in 1956 except for the 1996 contest when the nation was eliminated in a pre-contest elimination round.

As part of its duties as participating broadcaster, ARD organises the selection of its entry in the Eurovision Song Contest and broadcasts the event in the country. Since 1996, ARD had delegated the participation in the contest to its member Norddeutscher Rundfunk (NDR). Between 1996 and 2008 as well as in 2010, NDR had set up national finals with several artists to choose both the song and performer to compete at Eurovision for Germany. NDR internally selected both the artist and song for the contest in 2009, while in 2011, the broadcaster internally selected the artist and organised a national final to select the song. On 21 June 2011, NDR announced that they would continue their collaboration with private broadcaster ProSieben to organise a national final in the format of a talent show contest to select its entry.

== Before Eurovision ==
=== Unser Star für Baku ===
Unser Star für Baku (English: Our Star for Baku) was the competition that selected Germany's entry for the Eurovision Song Contest 2012. The competition consisted of five heats, a quarter-final, a semi-final and a final that took place between 12 January 2012 and 16 February 2012 at the Köln-Mülheim Studios in Cologne, hosted by Sandra Rieß and Steven Gätjen. Like in the previous two years, the competition was co-produced by the production company Brainpool, which also co-produced the Eurovision Song Contest 2011 in Düsseldorf. The shows were broadcast alternatively on ProSieben and Das Erste; the heats and semi-final were broadcast on ProSieben, while the quarter-final and final were broadcast on Das Erste as well as online via NDR's official website ndr.de.

==== Format ====
The competition consisted of eight shows: five heats between 12 January 2012 and 6 February 2012, a quarter-final on 9 February 2012, a semi-final on 13 February 2012 and a final on 16 February 2012. In each of the first two heats, 10 of the 20 contestants performed and five were eliminated from the competition. An additional two contestants were eliminated in each of the third and fourth heat, while one was eliminated in each of the fifth heat and quarter-final, respectively, and two were eliminated in the semi-final. The remaining two contestants proceeded to the final where they each performed their three songs bidding for Eurovision and the German entry was selected. The results of all eight shows were determined by public televoting, including options for landline and SMS voting.

Three music experts also provided feedback in regards to the contestants during each show. The experts were:

- Thomas D. – rapper
- Alina Süggeler – singer
- Stefan Raab – singer-songwriter, co-presenter of the Eurovision Song Contest 2011

==== Competing entries ====
Interested performers aged over 18 were able to apply for the competition by submitting an online application and presenting themselves at casting shows held in the following cities and locations:

- 29 September 2011: Cologne (Köln-Mülheim Studios)
- 5 November 2011: Nuremberg (Franken Studios)
- 12 November 2011: Mannheim (Saarländischer Rundfunk Studios)
- 19 November 2011: Essen (Delta Musik Park)
- 26 November 2011: Hannover (NDR Studios)

By the end of the process, 20 contestants were selected by Thomas D. together with an expert panel consisting of representatives of ARD, ProSieben and Brainpool. The four candidate Eurovision songs were announced during the final.

Competing songs
Song	Songwriter(s)
"Alone"	Gary Go, Emanuel Kiriakou
"Conflicted"	Martin Mulholland
"Quietly"	Alex Geringas, Liz Vidal, Guy Roche
"Standing Still"	Steve Robson, Jamie Cullum, Wayne Hector

==== Elimination chart ====
Color key:

–	Contestant received the fewest public votes and was eliminated
–	Contestant received the most public votes

Contestant	Heat 1	Heat 2	Heat 3	Heat 4	Heat 5	Quarter-final	Semi-final		Final
Roman Lob	2nd 14.9%	—N/a	1st 11.4%	1st	1st	1st	1st	1st	Winner; 50.7%
Ornella de Santis	—N/a	5th 12.3%	3rd 10.1%	3rd	5th	3rd	3rd	2nd	Runner-up; 49.3%
Yana Gercke	—N/a	2nd 13.0%	4th 10.1%	2nd	3rd	2nd	2nd	3rd	
Shelly Phillips	1st 15.5%	—N/a	6th 9.8%	4th	2nd	4th	4th		
Katja Petri	5th 14.7%	—N/a	8th 9.6%	6th	4th	5th			
Céline Huber	3rd 14.7%	—N/a	2nd 10.3%	5th	6th				
Umut Anil	—N/a	4th 12.5%	7th 9.8%	7th					
Sebastian Dey	—N/a	3rd 12.7%	5th 9.9%	8th					
Leonie Burgmer	4th 14.7%	—N/a	9th 9.6%						
Rachel Scharnberg	—N/a	1st 13.3%	10th 9.4%						
Vera Reissmüller	—N/a	6th 12.3%							
Andrew Fischer	—N/a	7th 9.4%							
Tina Sander	—N/a	8th 7.1%							
Jörg Müller-Lornsen	—N/a	9th 4.0%							
Polly Zeiler	—N/a	10th 3.4%							
Kai Nötting	6th 14.5%								
Jil Rock	7th 5.9%								
Yasmin Gueroui	8th 2.4%								
Salih Özcan	9th 1.7%								
Jan Verweij	10th 1.0%								

==== Heats ====
The five televised heats took place between 2 February and 2 March 2010. Five contestants were eliminated in each of the first two heats, while two contestants were eliminated in each of the third and fourth heats, and one contestant was eliminated in the fifth heat; the remaining five contestants proceeded to the quarter-final.

Heat 1 – 12 January 2012
R/O	Artist	Song (Original artists)	Televote	Place	Result
1	Katja Petri	"Marry You" (Bruno Mars)	14.7%	5	Advanced
2	Jan Verweij	"Closer to the Edge" (Thirty Seconds to Mars)	1.0%	10	—N/a
3	Leonie Burgmer	"Stronger Than Me" (Amy Winehouse)	14.7%	4	Advanced
4	Yasmin Gueroui	"Not Fair" (Lily Allen)	2.4%	8	—N/a
5	Kai Nötting	"More" (Usher)	14.5%	6	—N/a
6	Shelly Phillips	"Valerie" (The Zutons)	15.5%	1	Advanced
7	Salih Özcan	"Señorita" (Justin Timberlake)	1.7%	9	—N/a
8	Céline Huber	"Beautiful Disaster" (Kelly Clarkson)	14.7%	3	Advanced
9	Jil Rock	"Moves like Jagger" (Maroon 5)	5.9%	7	—N/a
10	Roman Lob	"After Tonight" (Justin Nozuka)	14.9%	2	Advanced

Heat 2 – 19 January 2012
R/O	Artist	Song (Original artists)	Televote	Place	Result
1	Andrew Fischer	"Tears in Heaven" (Eric Clapton)	9.4%	7	—N/a
2	Polly Zeiler	"Grenade" (Bruno Mars)	3.4%	10	—N/a
3	Sebastian Dey	"This Love" (Maroon 5)	12.7%	3	Advanced
4	Jörg Müller-Lornsen	"Maybe Tomorrow" (Stereophonics)	4.0%	9	—N/a
5	Ornella de Santis	"Slow Motion" (Karina Pasian)	12.3%	5	Advanced
6	Rachel Scharnberg	"My Baby Left Me" (Rox)	13.3%	1	Advanced
7	Tina Sander	"Geronimo" (Aura Dione)	7.1%	8	—N/a
8	Umut Anil	"Straight Up" (Paula Abdul)	12.5%	4	Advanced
9	Yana Gercke	"Price Tag" (Jessie J)	13.0%	2	Advanced
10	Vera Reissmüller	"Fooled Me Again, Honest Eyes" (Lady Gaga)	12.3%	6	—N/a

Heat 3 – 26 January 2012
R/O	Artist	Song (Original artists)	Televote	Place	Result
1	Rachel Scharnberg	"Like a Star" (Corinne Bailey Rae)	9.4%	10	—N/a
2	Leonie Burgmer	"I Love Your Smile" (Charlie Winston)	9.6%	9	—N/a
3	Sebastian Dey	"Amnesie" (own composition)	9.9%	5	Advanced
4	Katja Petri	"Lego House" (Ed Sheeran)	9.6%	8	Advanced
5	Umut Anil	"Weitergehen" (Tim Bendzko)	9.8%	7	Advanced
6	Céline Huber	"How Come You Don't Call Me" (Alicia Keys)	10.3%	2	Advanced
7	Ornella de Santis	"I Want You Back" (The Jackson 5)	10.1%	3	Advanced
8	Shelly Phillips	"Forget You" (CeeLo Green)	9.8%	6	Advanced
9	Yana Gercke	"Roxanne" (The Police)	10.1%	4	Advanced
10	Roman Lob	"Easy" (Commodores)	11.4%	1	Advanced

Heat 4 – 2 February 2012
R/O	Artist	Song (Original artists)	Place	Result
1	Sebastian Dey	"Hey, Hey, Hey" (own composition)	8	—N/a
2	Katja Petri	"The '59 Sound" (The Gaslight Anthem)	6	Advanced
3	Céline Huber	"Right to Be Wrong" (Joss Stone)	5	Advanced
4	Umut Anil	"Someone like You" (Adele)	7	—N/a
5	Shelly Phillips	"Waterfalls" (TLC)	4	Advanced
6	Ornella de Santis	"Try" (Nelly Furtado)	3	Advanced
7	Yana Gercke	"Titanium" (David Guetta feat. Sia)	2	Advanced
8	Roman Lob	"Drops of Jupiter (Tell Me)" (Train)	1	Advanced

Heat 5 – 6 February 2012
R/O	Artist	Song (Original artists)	Place	Result
1	Katja Petri	"Certain Someone" (own composition)	4	Advanced
2	Ornella de Santis	"You Are the Sunshine of My Life" (Stevie Wonder)	5	Advanced
3	Céline Huber	"Russian Roulette" (Rihanna)	6	—N/a
4	Shelly Phillips	"I Try" (Macy Gray)	2	Advanced
5	Yana Gercke	"We Found Love" (Rihanna)	3	Advanced
6	Roman Lob	"Drive" (Incubus)	1	Advanced

==== Quarter-final ====
The televised quarter-final took place on 9 February 2012 where an additional contestant was eliminated and the remaining four contestants proceeded to the semi-final.

Quarter-final – 9 February 2012
R/O	Artist	First song (Original artists)	R/O	Second song (Original artists)	Place	Result
1	Katja Petri	"All You Wanted" (Michelle Branch)	6	"Stay" (Hurts)	5	—N/a
2	Ornella de Santis	"I'll Be There" (The Jackson 5)	7	"Love the Way You Lie (Part II)" (Rihanna)	3	Advanced
3	Shelly Phillips	"Can't Take My Eyes Off You" (Lauryn Hill)	8	"Have It All" (Jeremy Kay)	4	Advanced
4	Yana Gercke	"Who Knew" (Pink)	9	"Talking to the Moon (Bruno Mars)	2	Advanced
5	Roman Lob	"You Give Me Something" (James Morrison)	10	"Day by Day" (own composition)	1	Advanced

==== Semi-final ====
The televised semi-final took place on 13 February 2012 where an additional two contestants were eliminated and the remaining two contestants proceeded to the final.

Semi-final – 13 February 2012
R/O	Artist	First song (Original artists)	Place	R/O	Second song (Original artists)	Place	Result
1	Shelly Phillips	"Das Astronautenlied" (own composition)	4	N/A (Already eliminated)			—N/a
2	Ornella de Santis	"Eu vou ser mais eu" (own composition)	3	5	"If I Ain't Got You" (Alicia Keys)	2	Advanced
3	Yana Gercke	"Rolling in the Deep" (Adele)	2	6	"Skyscraper" (Demi Lovato)	3	—N/a
4	Roman Lob	"Bad Day" (Daniel Powter)	1	7	"Use Somebody" (Kings of Leon)	1	Advanced

===== Final =====
The televised final took place on 16 February 2012 where each of the two finalists performed three candidate Eurovision songs, including an individual song. The winner was selected through two rounds of public televoting. In the first round of voting, one song per finalist was selected to proceed to the second round. In the second round, the winner, "Standing Still" performed by Roman Lob, was selected. In addition to the performances of the competing entries, Frida Gold performed their song "Wovon sollen wir träumen?".

First Round – 16 February 2012
R/O	Artist	Song	Televote	Result
1	Roman Lob	"Conflicted"	6.5%	—N/a
2	Ornella de Santis	"Quietly"	70.0%	Advanced
3	Roman Lob	"Alone"	16.7%	—N/a
4	Ornella de Santis	"Alone"	17.6%	—N/a
5	Roman Lob	"Standing Still"	76.8%	Advanced
6	Ornella de Santis	"Standing Still"	12.4%	—N/a

Second Round – 16 February 2012
R/O	Artist	Song	Televote	Place
1	Ornella de Santis	"Quietly"	49.3%	2
2	Roman Lob	"Standing Still"	50.7%	1

== At Eurovision ==
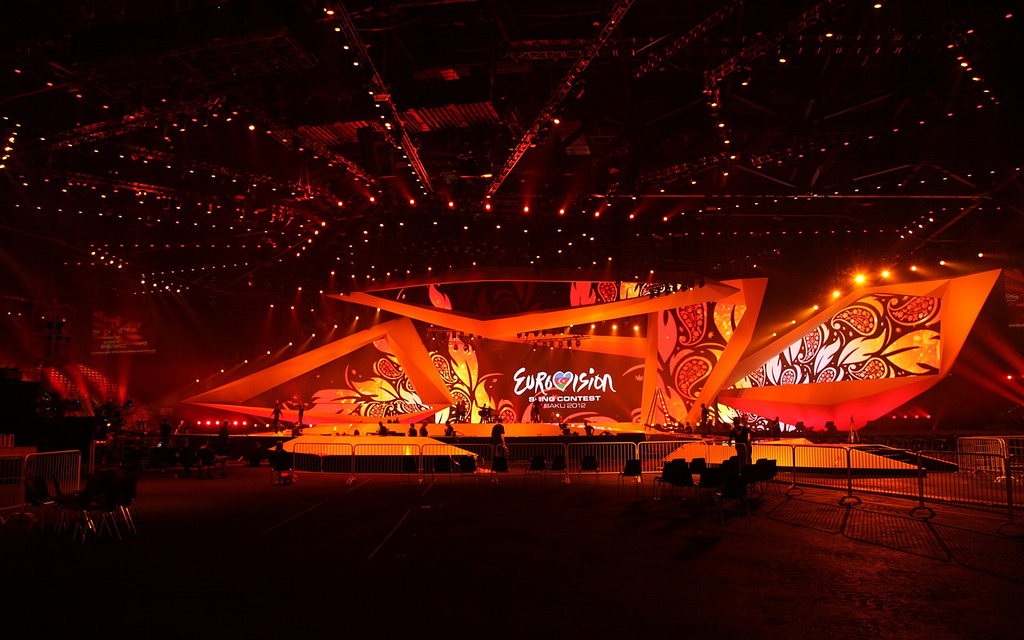
The Eurovision Song Contest 2012 took place at the Baku Crystal Hall in Baku, Azerbaijan

According to Eurovision rules, all nations with the exceptions of the host country and the "Big Five" (France, Germany, Italy, Spain and the United Kingdom) are required to qualify from one of two semi-finals in order to compete for the final; the top ten countries from each semi-final progress to the final. As a member of the "Big Five", Germany automatically qualified to compete in the final on 26 May 2012. In addition to their participation in the final, Germany is also required to broadcast and vote in one of the two semi-finals. This would have been regularly decided via a draw held during the semi-final allocation draw on 25 January 2012, however, prior to the draw, ARD requested of the European Broadcasting Union that Germany be allowed to broadcast and vote in the second semi-final on 24 May 2012, which was approved by the contest's Reference Group.

In Germany, the two semi-finals and the final were broadcast on Das Erste with commentary by Peter Urban. ARD also broadcast all three shows via radio on NDR 2 with commentary by Thomas Mohr, and on hr3 with commentary by Tim Frühling. The final was watched by 8.34 million viewers in Germany, which meant a market share of 36.7 per cent. The German spokesperson, who announced the top 12-point score awarded by the German votes during the final, was Anke Engelke who previously co-hosted the Eurovision Song Contest 2011.

=== Final ===
Roman Lob took part in technical rehearsals on 19 and 20 May, followed by dress rehearsals on 25 and 26 May. This included the jury final on 13 May where the professional juries of each country watched and voted on the competing entries. The running order for the semi-finals and final was decided by through another draw on 20 March 2012, and as one of the five wildcard countries, Germany chose to perform in position 20, following the entry from Spain and before the entry from Malta.

The German performance featured Roman Lob performing on stage in a white cap and a dark open shirt with a white t-shirt inside with two guitarists, a drummer and a pianist. The stage colours were dark with white spotlights and the LED screens displayed a dark background that transitioned from single moving red dots to white lights towards the end of the song which created a starry sky effect. The four musicians that joined Roman Lob on stage were Alexander Linster, Marc Awounou, Thomas Fietz and Tobias Schmitz. Germany placed eighth in the final, scoring 110 points.

=== Voting ===
Voting during the three shows consisted of 50 percent public televoting and 50 percent from a jury deliberation. The jury consisted of five music industry professionals who were citizens of the country they represent. This jury was asked to judge each contestant based on: vocal capacity; the stage performance; the song's composition and originality; and the overall impression by the act. In addition, no member of a national jury could be related in any way to any of the competing acts in such a way that they cannot vote impartially and independently.

Following the release of the full split voting by the EBU after the conclusion of the competition, it was revealed that Germany had placed sixth with the public televote and tenth with the jury vote. In the public vote, Germany scored 125 points and in the jury vote the nation scored 98 points.

Below is a breakdown of points awarded to Germany and awarded by Germany in the second semi-final and grand final of the contest. The nation awarded its 12 points to Sweden in the semi-final and the final of the contest.

==== Points awarded to Germany ====
Points awarded to Germany (Final)
Score	Country
12 points	
10 points	Denmark; Estonia; Hungary; Ireland; Portugal
8 points	Italy
7 points	France; Latvia
6 points	United Kingdom
5 points	
4 points	Austria; Croatia; Switzerland
3 points	Lithuania; Norway; Spain
2 points	Albania; Georgia; Malta; Netherlands; Slovenia
1 point	Finland

==== Points awarded by Germany ====
Points awarded by Germany (Semi-final 2)
Score	Country
12 points	Sweden
10 points	Serbia
8 points	Netherlands
7 points	Estonia
6 points	Turkey
5 points	Bosnia and Herzegovina
4 points	Slovenia
3 points	Portugal
2 points	Bulgaria
1 point	Croatia

Points awarded by Germany (Final)
Score	Country
12 points	Sweden
10 points	Serbia
8 points	Turkey
7 points	Russia
6 points	Albania
5 points	Denmark
4 points	Estonia
3 points	Iceland
2 points	Italy
1 point	Greece

==== Detailed voting results from Germany ====
Source:

==== Semi-final 2 ====
Jury points awarded in second semi-final:

12 points	Sweden
10 points	Estonia
8 points	Slovenia
7 points	Serbia
6 points	Netherlands
5 points	Bosnia and Herzegovina
4 points	Slovakia
3 points	Croatia
2 points	Malta
1 point	Portugal

==== Final ====
Jury points awarded in the final:

12 points	Sweden
10 points	Estonia
8 points	Iceland
7 points	Denmark
6 points	Albania
5 points	Serbia
4 points	Bosnia and Herzegovina
3 points	Spain
2 points	Italy
1 point	Ireland
