= Slovenia in the Eurovision Song Contest 2013 =

- Eurovision Song Contest 2013
- Participating broadcaster: Radiotelevizija Slovenija (RTVSLO)
- Country: Slovenia
- Selection process: Internal selection
- Announcement date: Artist: 1 February 2013; Song: 14 February 2013

Competing entry
- Song: "Straight into Love"
- Artist: Hannah
- Songwriters: Hannah Mancini; Gregor Zemljič; Erik Margan; Matija Rodić; Marko Primužak

Placement
- Semi-final result: Failed to qualify (16th)

Participation chronology

Slovenia was represented at the Eurovision Song Contest 2013 with the song "Straight into Love", written by Hannah Mancini, Gregor Zemljič, Erik Margan, Matija Rodić, and Marko Primužak, and performed by Hannah herself. The Slovene participating broadcaster, Radiotelevizija Slovenija (RTVSLO), internally selected its entry for the contest. Hannah was announced at the Slovenian representative on 1 February 2013, while the song, "Straight into Love", was presented to the public on 14 February 2013.

Slovenia was drawn to compete in the first semi-final of the Eurovision Song Contest which took place on 14 May 2013. Performing during the show in position 3, "Straight into Love" was not announced among the top 10 entries of the first semi-final and therefore did not qualify to compete in the final. It was later revealed that Slovenia placed sixteenth (last) out of the 16 participating countries in the semi-final with 8 points.

== Background ==
Prior to the 2013 contest, Radiotelevizija Slovenija (RTVSLO) had participated in the Eurovision Song Contest representing Slovenia eighteen times since its first entry in 1993. Its highest placing in the contest, to this point, has been seventh place, achieved on two occasions: in 1995 with the song "Prisluhni mi" performed by Darja Švajger and in 2001 with the song "Energy" performed by Nuša Derenda. The country's only other top ten result was achieved in 1997 when Tanja Ribič performing "Zbudi se" placed tenth. Since the introduction of semi-finals to the format of the contest in 2004, Slovenia had thus far only managed to qualify to the final on two occasions. In 2012, "Verjamem" performed by Eva Boto failed to qualify to the final.

As part of its duties as participating broadcaster, RTVSLO organises the selection of its entry in the Eurovision Song Contest and broadcasts the event in the country. The broadcaster confirmed its participation in the 2013 contest on 15 December 2012 after speculation that a withdrawal was being considered. RTVSLO has traditionally selected its entry through a national final entitled Evrovizijska Melodija (EMA), which has been produced with variable formats. For 2013, the broadcaster opted to forego the use of this national final in order to internally select its entry due to time constraints and reduced funding.

== Before Eurovision ==
=== Internal selection ===
RTV Slovenija announced in January 2013 that both the artist and song that would represent Slovenia at the Eurovision Song Contest 2013 would be selected internally in cooperation with Radio Val 202. An expert committee consisting of Aleksander Radić (Head of the Slovenian delegation at the Eurovision Song Contest), Andrej Hofer (representative of the RTV Slovenija entertainment department), Sabrina Povšič Štimec (representative of the RTV Slovenija public relations department), Olga Škrube (representative of the RTV Slovenija legal department), Andrej Karoli (music editor for Radio Val 202), Blaz Tišler (music editor for Radio Val 202) and Mirko Stular (editor-in-chief for Radio Val 202) nominated five artists and composers to be directly invited by the broadcaster to submit entries, while additional entries from record labels as well as artists and composers who did not receive an invitation were also considered by the committee which selected the Slovenian entry from the received submissions.

On 1 February 2013, RTV Slovenija announced that they had selected Hannah Mancini to represent Slovenia in Malmö. Hannah had previously attempted to represent Slovenia at the Eurovision Song Contest in 2011 by competing in the national final EMA 2011 with the song "Ti si tisti" together with Sylvain and Mike Vale. The Slovenian song, "Straight into Love", was presented to the public during a press conference which took place on 14 February 2013 at the RTV Slovenija Studio 1 in Ljubljana. "Straight into Love" was written by Hannah herself together with Gregor Zemljič, Erik Margan, Matija Rodić and Marko Primužak. In regards to the song, Hannah stated: "The song is about how I fall in love. About the beginning of it."

=== Promotion ===
Hannah's promotion for "Straight into Love" as the Slovenian Eurovision entry included a performance on 13 April during the Eurovision in Concert event which was held at the Melkweg venue in Amsterdam, Netherlands and hosted by Marlayne and Linda Wagenmakers.

== At Eurovision ==
According to Eurovision rules, all nations with the exceptions of the host country and the "Big Five" (France, Germany, Italy, Spain and the United Kingdom) are required to qualify from one of two semi-finals in order to compete for the final; the top ten countries from each semi-final progress to the final. The European Broadcasting Union (EBU) split up the competing countries into six different pots based on voting patterns from previous contests, with countries with favourable voting histories put into the same pot. On 17 January 2013, an allocation draw was held which placed each country into one of the two semi-finals, as well as which half of the show they would perform in. Slovenia was placed into the first semi-final, to be held on 14 May 2013, and was scheduled to perform in the first half of the show.

Once all the competing songs for the 2013 contest had been released, the running order for the semi-finals was decided by the shows' producers rather than through another draw, so that similar songs were not placed next to each other. Slovenia was set to perform in position 3, following the entry from Estonia and before the entry from Croatia.

In Slovenia, the semi-finals were televised on TV SLO 2 and the final was televised on TV SLO 1. All shows featured commentary by Andrej Hofer. The Slovenian spokesperson, who announced the Slovenian votes during the final, was Andrea F.

=== Semi-final ===
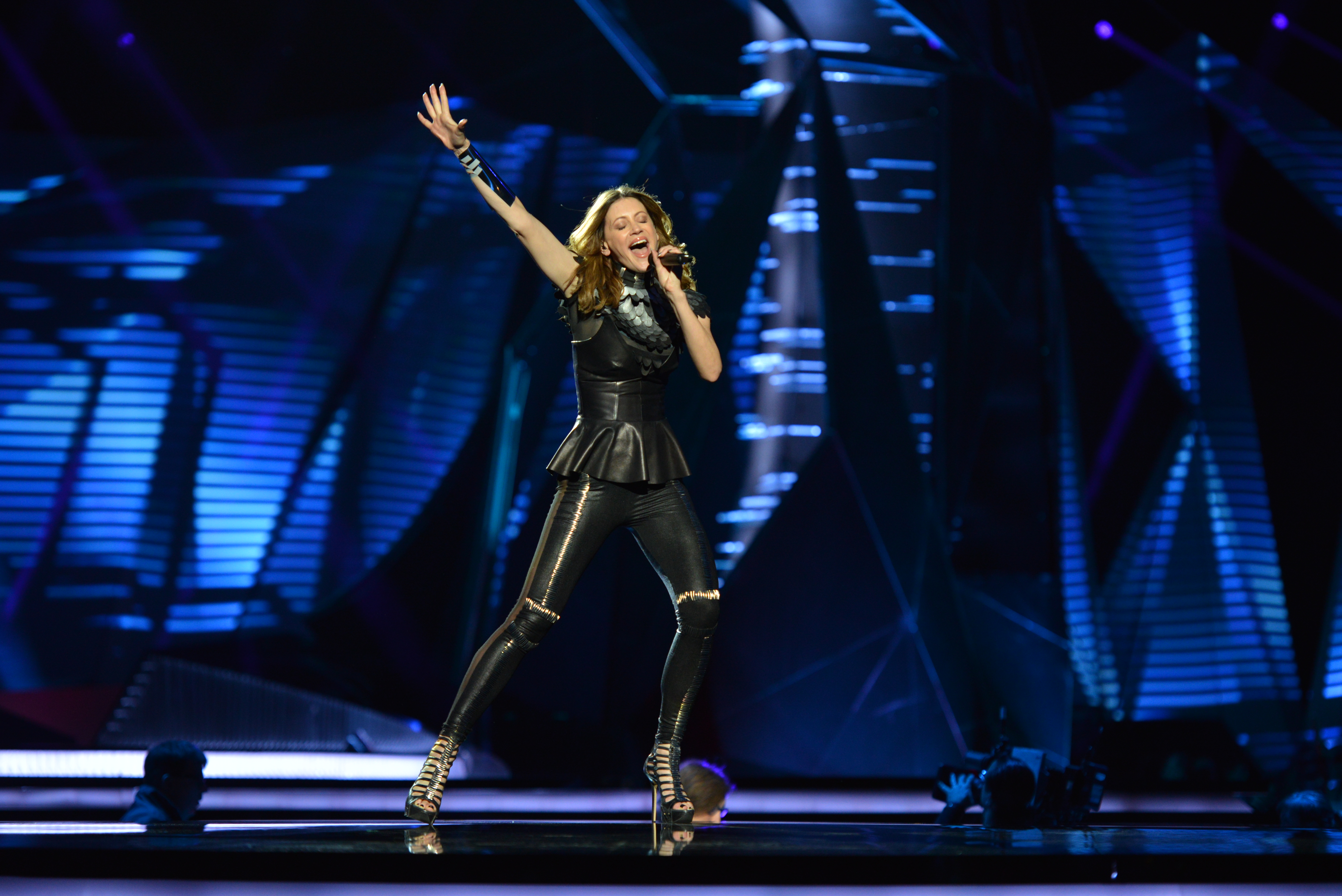
Hannah during a rehearsal before the first semi-final

Hannah took in technical rehearsals on 6 and 10 May, followed by dress rehearsals on 13 and 14 May. This included the jury final on 13 May where the professional juries of each country watched and voted on the competing entries.

The Slovenian performance featured Hannah performing choreographed movements, which included a run over the catwalk, in a black leather costume together with three dancers who also wore black outfits. The stage colours were predominantly white and blue. The three dancers that joined Hannah on stage were Anže Škrube, Primož Pavlič and Matic Zadravec from the Maestro Dance Studio. Hannah was also joined by two backing vocalists on stage: Linda Andrews and Susanne Ørum.

Despite high hopes from Slovenians, at the end of the show Slovenia was not announced among the top 10 entries in the second semi-final and therefore failed to qualify to compete in the final. It was later revealed that Slovenia placed sixteenth (last) in the semi-final, receiving a total of 8 points.

=== Voting ===
Voting during the three shows involved each country awarding points from 1–8, 10 and 12 as determined by a combination of 50% national jury and 50% televoting. Each nation's jury consisted of five music industry professionals who are citizens of the country they represent. This jury judged each entry based on: vocal capacity; the stage performance; the song's composition and originality; and the overall impression by the act. In addition, no member of a national jury was permitted to be related in any way to any of the competing acts in such a way that they cannot vote impartially and independently. The members that comprised the Slovenian jury were: Dušan Hren (director), Urša Vlašič (lyricist, writer of the 1998, 2005, 2006 and 2011 Slovene contest entries), Darja Švajger (singer, vocal coach, represented Slovenia in the 1995 and 1999 contests), Raay (singer, producer) and Katja Koren (singer).

Following the release of the full split voting by the EBU after the conclusion of the competition, it was revealed that Slovenia had placed sixteenth (last) with both the public televote and the jury vote in the first semi-final. In the public vote, Slovenia received an average rank of 11.47, while with the jury vote, Slovenia received an average rank of 13.17.

Below is a breakdown of points awarded to Slovenia and awarded by Slovenia in the first semi-final and grand final of the contest. The nation awarded its 12 points to Ukraine in the semi-final and to Denmark in the final of the contest.

==== Points awarded to Slovenia ====
Points awarded to Slovenia (Semi-final 1)
Score	Country
12 points	
10 points	
8 points	
7 points	
6 points	
5 points	Croatia
4 points	
3 points	Montenegro
2 points	
1 point	

==== Points awarded by Slovenia ====
Points awarded by Slovenia (Semi-final 1)
Score	Country
12 points	Ukraine
10 points	Russia
8 points	Denmark
7 points	Moldova
6 points	Belgium
5 points	Serbia
4 points	Belarus
3 points	Netherlands
2 points	Croatia
1 point	Austria

Points awarded by Slovenia (Final)
Score	Country
12 points	Denmark
10 points	Russia
8 points	Italy
7 points	Netherlands
6 points	Sweden
5 points	Norway
4 points	Iceland
3 points	Azerbaijan
2 points	Belgium
1 point	United Kingdom

===== Jury points awarded by Slovenia =====
Jury points awarded by Slovenia (Semi-final 1)
Score	Country
12 points	Russia
10 points	Moldova
8 points	Netherlands
7 points	Ukraine
6 points	Denmark
5 points	Austria
4 points	Belgium
3 points	Belarus
2 points	Estonia
1 point	Lithuania

Jury points awarded by Slovenia (Final)
Score	Country
12 points	Russia
10 points	Sweden
8 points	Denmark
7 points	Netherlands
6 points	Azerbaijan
5 points	Moldova
4 points	United Kingdom
3 points	Ukraine
2 points	Italy
1 point	Belgium
