= Eva Boto =

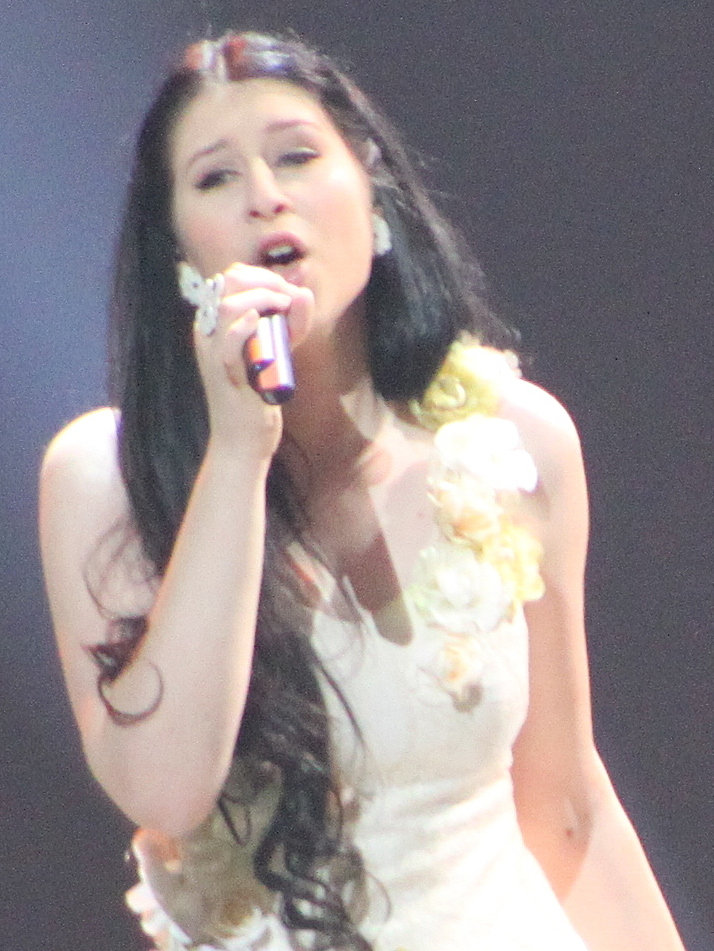
- Eva Boto at Eurovision 2012

Background information
- Born: December 1, 1995 (age 29); Dravograd, Slovenia
- Genres: Pop
- Occupation(s): Singer, songwriter
- Years active: 2012–present

Eva Boto (born 1 December 1995) is a Slovenian singer. At age 16, she represented Slovenia at the Eurovision Song Contest 2012 in Baku, Azerbaijan, with "Verjamem".

== Discography ==
Albums

- 2019: Ko najdeš sebe

singles

- Verjamem (2012)
- To leto bo moje (Max feat. Jan Plestenjak & Eva Boto) (2012)
- Dvigni mi krila (2012)
- Na kožo pisana (2014)
- Kaj je to življenje (2016)
- Tvoja (2018)
- Zavedno (2019)
- Naj vedo (2019)
- Dovolj je poletja (with Gašperjem Rifljem) (2019)
- Lepo je živet (2020)
- Ko najdeš sebe (2020)
- Ti (2021)
- Kdo ti bo dušo dal (2021)
- Misliš na njo (2021)
- Nočem, da greš (2022)
- Za božič kot otrok (2022)
- Sam, da ne zebe (2023)
- Kjer najbolj gori (2024)
- Moje zlato (2024)

Preceded by Maja Keuc with "No One"	Slovenia in the Eurovision Song Contest; 2012	Succeeded by Hannah Mancini with "Straight Into Love"
