= List of Slovenian singers =

A list of notable singers and songwriters from Slovenia:

== A ==
- Cvetka Ahlin
- Alya
- Peter Andrej
- Urška Arlič Gololičič

== B ==
- Luka Basi
- Julij Betetto
- Helena Blagne
- Janez Bončina – Benč
- Eva Boto

== C ==
- Sabina Cvilak

== D ==
- Nuša Derenda
- Anžej Dežan
- Rebeka Dremelj
- Ben Dolic
- Nina Donelli

== E ==
- Ines Erbus

== F ==
- Neca Falk

== G ==
- Jarmila Gerbič
- Alenka Godec
- Alenka Gotar
- Ivan Grohar
- Sanja Grohar

== H ==
- Hilda Hölzl

== J ==
- July Jones

== K ==
- Matt Kaye
- Maja Keuc
- Daniel Kovac
- Tinkara Kovač
- Moni Kovačič
- Vlado Kreslin
- Domen Križaj
- Minca Krkovič

== L ==
- Lara-B
- Peter Lovšin
- Ula Ložar

== M ==
- Magnifico
- Martina Majerle
- Hannah Mancini
- ManuElla
- Iztok Mlakar

== N ==
- Omar Naber
- Neisha

== P ==
- Tomaž Pengov
- Oto Pestner
- Zoran Predin
- Gaja Prestor
- Nina Pušlar

== R ==
- Raiven
- Regina
- Vili Resnik
- Tanja Ribič
- Anja Rupel

== S ==
- Senidah
- Majda Sepe
- Lea Sirk
- Klemen Slakonja
- Ana Soklič
- Karmen Stavec
- Adi Smolar

== Š ==
- Darja Švajger

== T ==
- Saša Tabaković
- Andrej Trobentar

== V ==
- Fanchette Verhunc

== Y ==
- Irena Yebuah Tiran

== Z ==
- Nika Zorjan

== Ž ==
- Mia Žnidarič

== See also ==
- Music of Slovenia
