= Slovenia in the Eurovision Song Contest 2004 =

- Eurovision Song Contest 2004
- Participating broadcaster: Radiotelevizija Slovenija (RTVSLO)
- Country: Slovenia
- Selection process: Evrovizijska Melodija 2004
- Selection date: 15 February 2004

Competing entry
- Song: "Stay Forever"
- Artist: Platin
- Songwriters: Simon Gomilšek; Diana Lečnik

Placement
- Semi-final result: Failed to qualify (21st)

Participation chronology

Slovenia was represented at the Eurovision Song Contest 2004 with the song "Stay Forever", composed by Simon Gomilšek, with lyrics by Diana Lečnik, and performed by the duo Platin, which consists of Lečnik and Gomilšek. The Slovene participating broadcaster, Radiotelevizija Slovenija (RTVSLO), held the national final Evrovizijska Melodija 2004 in order to select its entry for the contest. 32 entries competed in the national final which consisted of five shows: four semi-finals and a final. Entries were selected to advance from the semi-finals based on a public televote and a four-member jury panel. Sixteen entries qualified to compete in the final where the winner was selected over two rounds of voting. In the first round, the top three entries were selected following the combination of votes from a five-member jury panel and a public televote. In the second round, "Stay Forever" performed by Platin was selected as the winner entirely by a public televote.

Slovenia competed in the semi-final of the Eurovision Song Contest which took place on 12 May 2004. Performing during the show in position 16, "Stay Forever" was not announced among the top 10 entries of the semi-final and therefore did not qualify to compete in the final. It was later revealed that Slovenia placed twenty-first out of the 22 participating countries in the semi-final with 5 points.

== Background ==
Prior to the 2004 contest, Radiotelevizija Slovenija (RTVSLO) had participated in the Eurovision Song Contest representing Slovenia nine times since its first entry in 1993. Its highest placing in the contest, to this point, has been seventh place, achieved on two occasions: in 1995 with the song "Prisluhni mi" performed by Darja Švajger, and in 2001 with the song "Energy" performed by Nuša Derenda. Its only other top ten result was achieved in 1997 when "Zbudi se" performed by Tanja Ribič placed tenth. In 2003, "Nanana" performed by Karmen placed twenty-third.

As part of its duties as participating broadcaster, RTVSLO organises the selection of its entry in the Eurovision Song Contest and broadcasts the event in the country. The broadcaster confirmed its participation in the 2004 contest on 3 September 2003. The broadcaster has traditionally selected its entry through a national final entitled Evrovizijska Melodija (EMA), which has been produced with variable formats. For 2004, RTVSLO opted to organise Evrovizijska Melodija 2004 (EMA 2004) to select its entry.

== Before Eurovision ==
=== Evrovizijska Melodija 2004 ===
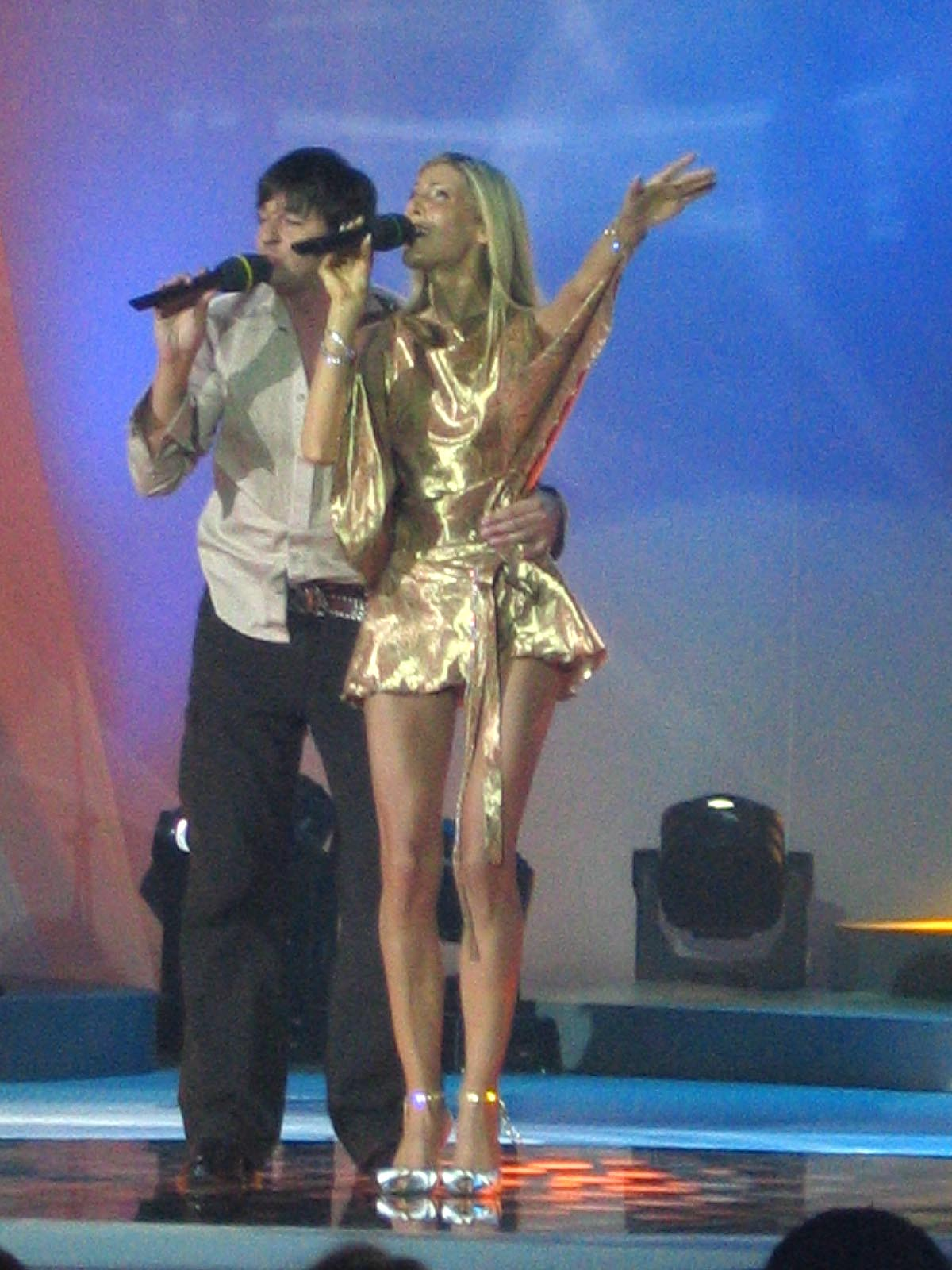
Platin performing at EMA 2004

Evrovizijska Melodija 2004 (EMA 2004) was the ninth edition of the national final format Evrovizijska Melodija (EMA) organised by RTVSLO to select its entry for the Eurovision Song Contest 2004. The competition consisted of five shows that commenced on 11 January 2004 and concluded on 15 February 2004. All shows in the competition were broadcast on TV SLO1 and online via the broadcaster's website rtvslo.si. The final was also broadcast on Radio Val 202.

==== Format ====
The format of the competition consisted of five televised shows: four semi-finals held on 11, 18, 25 January 2004, and 1 February 2004, and a final held on 15 February 2004. Eight songs competed in each semi-final and public televoting exclusively determined three finalists to proceed to the final. A jury also selected four wildcard finalists out of the twenty competing songs that did not qualify from the semi-finals. Sixteen songs competed in the final where the winner was selected over two rounds of voting. In the first round, the 50/50 combination of points from a five-member expert jury and a public televote selected three songs out of the sixteen competing songs to proceed to a superfinal. The expert jury and the televote each assigned points as follows: 1–8, 10 and 12, with the top three being determined by the songs that receive the highest overall scores when the votes were combined. Ties were broken by giving priority to the song that achieved the most points from the jury. In the superfinal, public televoting exclusively determined the winner.

==== Competing entries ====
Artists and composers were able to submit their entries to the broadcaster between 3 October 2003 and 28 November 2003. 83 entries were received by the broadcaster during the submission period. An expert committee consisting of Alen Steržaj (musician), Martin Žvelc (music producer), Darja Švajger (who represented Slovenia in 1995 and in 1999) and Armando Šturman (music editor for Radio Koper) selected thirty-two artists and songs for the competition from the received submissions. The competing artists were announced on 11 December 2003. Among the competing artists was Regina (who represented Slovenia in 1996).

| Artist | Song | Songwriter(s) |
|---|---|---|
| Aljoša Kovačič | "Sanje" | Milan Dekleva, Aljoša Kovačič |
| Alya | "Fluid" | Cvetka Omladič, Bor Zuljan |
| Ana Dežman | "Ni bilo zaman" | Milan Dekleva, Patrik Greblo |
| Chantal Hartmann | "Here and There and Everywhere" | Chantal Hartmann |
| Damijana Godnič | "Moja moč" | Jurko Starc, Igor Potočnik |
| Diona Dimm | "If You" | Ana Soklič, Simona Franko, Bojan Simončič, Gašper Kačar |
| Jasmina Cafnik | "Si tukaj al' te ni" | Drago Mislej, Danilo Kocjančič |
| Johnny Bravo | "Kar me ne ubije, me krepi" | Leon Oblak |
| Kalamari | "Boš prišla" | Jože Jež |
| Katrinas | "Živa" | Štefan Miljevič, Katrinas, Rok Golob |
| Kristina Oberzan | "Mavrica" | Milan Krapež, Milan Ferlež, Aldorica Bronson |
| Maja Slatinšek | "Slovo brez mej" | Mojca Seliškar, Maja Slatinšek, Raay |
| Marijan Novina | "Svet se vrti nazaj" | Marijan Novina, Urša Mravlje Fajon |
| Mikola | "Pot do sreče" | Mikola |
| Mojca Brecelj | "Brez mej" | Mojca Brecelj |
| Monika Pučelj | "Nič ne ustavi me" | Anja Rupel, Aleš Klinar |
| Natalija Verboten | "Cry on My Shoulder" | Urša Vlašič, Matjaž Vlašič |
| November | "No Reason to Cry" | Maja Osrajnik-Mithans, Grega Samar |
| Number One | "Lights Into My Eyes" | Roland Makovec, Franko Reja, Branko Kumar |
| Panda feat. Trkaj | "Tvoj svet" | Suzana Jeklic, Rok Terkaj, Andej Pompe |
| Platin | "Stay Forever" | Diana Lečnik, Simon Gomilšek |
| Polona | "Kralj neba" | Drago Mislej-Mef, Sašo Fajon |
| Pop Design | "In ti greš" | Tone Košmrlj, Zvone Hranjec |
| Prava stvar | "Junak" | Aleš Štefančič |
| Regina | "Plave očij" | Feri Lainšček, Aleksander Kogoj |
| Rebeka Dremelj | "Ne boš se igral" | Rebeka Dremelj, Frenk Nova |
| Rožmarinke | "Kliše" | Boris Benko |
| Tulio Furlanič | "O, ženske, ženske" | Damjana Kenda-Hussu, Marino Legovič |
| Victory | "Kako naj vem" | Karmen Stavec, Martin Štibernik |
| Yuhubanda | "Če zdaj odideš sama" | Urša Vlašič, Matjaž Vlašič |
| Ylenia Zobec | "Tvoj glas" | Damjana Kenda-Hussu, Marino Legovič |
| Žana and RnB Wannabes | "Požar" | Ropo & Hellga, Raay |

==== Semi-finals ====
RTVSLO held the four semi-finals of EMA 2004 on 11, 18, 25 January, and 1 February 2004 at its Studio 1 in Ljubljana, hosted by Peter Poles and Bernarda Žarn. A public televote selected three entries to proceed to the final from each semi-final, and the four entries that received a jury wildcard were announced during the fourth semi-final. The four-member jury panel that selected the wildcards consisted of Jernej Vene (music editor for Radio Slovenija), Martin Žvelc (music producer), Branka Kraner (singer), and Alen Steržaj (musician).

Semi-final 1 – 11 January 2004
| R/O | Artist | Song | Televote | Place | Result |
|---|---|---|---|---|---|
| 1 | Mojca Brecelj | "Brez mej" | 924 | 8 | —N/a |
| 2 | Aljoša Kovačič | "Sanje" | 941 | 7 | —N/a |
| 3 | Regina | "Plave očij" | 3,315 | 2 | Advanced |
| 4 | Platin | "Stay Forever" | 6,824 | 1 | Advanced |
| 5 | Johnny Bravo | "Kar me ne ubije, me krepi" | 1,689 | 6 | —N/a |
| 6 | Diona Dimm | "If You" | 3,198 | 3 | Advanced |
| 7 | Mikola | "Pot do sreče" | 1,888 | 5 | —N/a |
| 8 | Tulio Furlanič | "O, ženske, ženske" | 2,654 | 4 | Wildcard |

Semi-final 2 – 18 January 2004
| R/O | Artist | Song | Televote | Place | Result |
|---|---|---|---|---|---|
| 1 | Monika Pučelj | "Nič ne ustavi me" | 2,953 | 2 | Advanced |
| 2 | Natalija Verboten | "Cry on My Shoulder" | 11,694 | 1 | Advanced |
| 3 | Jasmina Cafnik | "Si tukaj al' te ni" | 588 | 8 | —N/a |
| 4 | Chantal Hartmann | "Here and There and Everywhere" | 1,655 | 4 | —N/a |
| 5 | Marijan Novina | "Svet se vrti nazaj" | 1,206 | 7 | Wildcard |
| 6 | Yuhubanda | "Če zdaj odideš sama" | 2,478 | 3 | Advanced |
| 7 | Ana Dežman | "Ni bilo zaman" | 1,386 | 6 | —N/a |
| 8 | Kalamari | "Boš prišla" | 1,649 | 5 | —N/a |

Semi-final 3 – 25 January 2004
| R/O | Artist | Song | Televote | Place | Result |
|---|---|---|---|---|---|
| 1 | Panda feat. Trkaj | "Tvoj svet" | 1,633 | 6 | —N/a |
| 2 | Polona | "Kralj neba" | 2,580 | 3 | Advanced |
| 3 | Prava stvar | "Junak" | 1,779 | 5 | Wildcard |
| 4 | Number One | "Lights Into My Eyes" | 1,049 | 7 | —N/a |
| 5 | Victory | "Kako naj vem" | 1,027 | 8 | —N/a |
| 6 | Alya | "Fluid" | 3,091 | 2 | Advanced |
| 7 | Kristina Oberzan | "Mavrica" | 1,904 | 4 | —N/a |
| 8 | Damijana Godnič | "Moja moč" | 3,217 | 1 | Advanced |

Semi-final 4 – 1 February 2004
| R/O | Artist | Song | Televote | Place | Result |
|---|---|---|---|---|---|
| 1 | November | "No Reason to Cry" | 1,345 | 5 | —N/a |
| 2 | Rebeka Dremelj | "Ne boš se igral" | 4,244 | 1 | Advanced |
| 3 | Ylenia Zobec | "Tvoj glas" | 1,493 | 4 | Wildcard |
| 4 | Maja Slatinšek | "Slovo brez mej" | 3,962 | 2 | Advanced |
| 5 | Rožmarinke | "Kliše" | 2,264 | 3 | Advanced |
| 6 | Pop Design | "In ti greš" | 1,097 | 8 | —N/a |
| 7 | Žana and RnB Wannabes | "Požar" | 1,322 | 6 | —N/a |
| 8 | Katrinas | "Živa" | 1,195 | 7 | —N/a |

==== Final ====
RTVSLO held the final of EMA 2004 on 15 February 2004 at the Gospodarsko razstavišče in Ljubljana, hosted by Miša Molk with Peter Poles and Bernarda Žarn hosting segments from the green room. In addition to the performances of the competing entries, former Slovenian Eurovision entrants performed as guests. The winner was selected over two rounds of voting. In the first round, three entries were selected to proceed to the second round based on the combination of points from a five-member jury panel and a public televote. The jury consisted of Daniela Tami (Head of the Swiss delegation at Eurovision), Karolina Gočeva (singer, who represented Macedonia in 2002), Manuel Ortega (singer, who represented Austria in 2002), Drago Ivanuša (composer and musician) and Lara Baruca (singer). In the second round, a public televote selected "Stay Forever" performed by Platin as the winner.

Final – 15 February 2004
| R/O | Artist | Song | Jury | Televote | | Total | Place |
| R/O | Artist | Song | Jury | Votes | Points | Total | Place |
|---|---|---|---|---|---|---|---|
| 1 | Yuhubanda | "Če zdaj odideš sama" | 0 | 2,557 | 4 | 4 | 11 |
| 2 | Rebeka Dremelj | "Ne boš se igral" | 0 | 3,698 | 5 | 5 | 10 |
| 3 | Polona | "Kralj neba" | 3 | 2,220 | 0 | 3 | 12 |
| 4 | Natalija Verboten | "Cry on My Shoulder" | 0 | 17,754 | 12 | 12 | 4 |
| 5 | Monika Pučelj | "Nič ne ustavi me" | 8 | 2,506 | 3 | 11 | 5 |
| 6 | Alya | "Fluid" | 4 | 4,436 | 8 | 12 | 3 |
| 7 | Ylenia Zobec | "Tvoj glas" | 7 | 1,437 | 0 | 7 | 7 |
| 8 | Prava stvar | "Junak" | 0 | 1,292 | 0 | 0 | 14 |
| 9 | Rožmarinke | "Kliše" | 12 | 4,080 | 6 | 18 | 2 |
| 10 | Regina | "Plave očij" | 1 | 2,446 | 2 | 3 | 13 |
| 11 | Tulio Furlanič | "O, ženske, ženske" | 6 | 1,556 | 0 | 6 | 8 |
| 12 | Diona Dimm | "If You" | 5 | 2,238 | 1 | 6 | 9 |
| 13 | Maja Slatinšek | "Slovo brez mej" | 2 | 4,263 | 7 | 9 | 6 |
| 14 | Platin | "Stay Forever" | 10 | 11,046 | 10 | 20 | 1 |
| 15 | Marijan Novina | "Svet se vrti nazaj" | 0 | 1,595 | 0 | 0 | 14 |
| 16 | Damijana Godnič | "Moja moč" | 0 | 1,512 | 0 | 0 | 14 |

Superfinal – 15 February 2004
| R/O | Artist | Song | Televote | Place |
|---|---|---|---|---|
| 1 | Alya | "Fluid" | 19,048 | 3 |
| 2 | Rožmarinke | "Kliše" | 21,805 | 2 |
| 3 | Platin | "Stay Forever" | 31,279 | 1 |

=== Controversy ===
Like in many previous editions of EMA, the public televote and the jury awarded conflicting scores. This caused some controversy, because the strongest televote favourite Natalija Verboten, received 0 points from the jury. Similarly, Bepop in 2003, Karmen Stavec in 2002 and 2001, and Tinkara Kovač in 1999 were also televote favourites. These entries usually came second, or failed to qualify because the points awarded by the jury outweighed the points they received from the televotes. The controversy led to the EMA 2005 results basing solely on the results of the televote.

== At Eurovision ==
It was announced that the competition's format would be expanded to include a semi-final in 2004. According to the rules, all nations with the exceptions of the host country, the "Big Four" (France, Germany, Spain, and the United Kingdom), and the ten highest placed finishers in the 2003 contest are required to qualify from the semi-final on 12 May 2004 in order to compete for the final on 15 May 2004; the top ten countries from the semi-final progress to the final. On 23 March 2004, an allocation draw was held which determined the running order for the semi-final and Slovenia was set to perform in position 16, following the entry from Macedonia and before the entry from Estonia. At the end of the semi-final, Slovenia was not announced among the top 10 entries and therefore failed to qualify to compete in the final. It was later revealed that Slovenia placed twenty-last in the semi-final, receiving a total of 5 points. The duo got married in Bosporus, Turkey the day after the semi-final, and Eurovision Song Contest 2003 winner Sertab Erener appeared during the wedding as a witness.

In Slovenia, the semi-final was televised on RTV SLO2 and the final was televised on RTV SLO1. Both shows featured commentary by Andrea F. The two shows were also broadcast via radio on Radio Slovenija with commentary by Jernej Vene. RTVSLO appointed Peter Poles as its spokesperson to announce the Slovenian votes during the final.

=== Voting ===
Below is a breakdown of points awarded to Slovenia and awarded by Slovenia in the semi-final and grand final of the contest. The nation awarded its 12 points to Serbia and Montenegro in the semi-final and the final of the contest.

Following the release of the televoting figures by the EBU after the conclusion of the competition, it was revealed that a total of 98,633 televotes were cast in Slovenia during the two shows: 36,789 votes during the semi-final and 61,844 votes during the final.

==== Points awarded to Slovenia ====
Points awarded to Slovenia (Semi-final)
| Score | Country |
|---|---|
| 12 points | |
| 10 points | |
| 8 points | |
| 7 points | |
| 6 points | |
| 5 points | |
| 4 points | |
| 3 points | Croatia |
| 2 points | |
| 1 point | Bosnia and Herzegovina; Macedonia |

==== Points awarded by Slovenia ====
Points awarded by Slovenia (Semi-final)
| Score | Country |
|---|---|
| 12 points | Serbia and Montenegro |
| 10 points | Bosnia and Herzegovina |
| 8 points | Ukraine |
| 7 points | Croatia |
| 6 points | Macedonia |
| 5 points | Albania |
| 4 points | Greece |
| 3 points | Cyprus |
| 2 points | Netherlands |
| 1 point | Malta |

Points awarded by Slovenia (Final)
| Score | Country |
|---|---|
| 12 points | Serbia and Montenegro |
| 10 points | Bosnia and Herzegovina |
| 8 points | Ukraine |
| 7 points | Macedonia |
| 6 points | Greece |
| 5 points | Croatia |
| 4 points | Albania |
| 3 points | Germany |
| 2 points | Sweden |
| 1 point | Cyprus |
