= I Wanna (Marie N song) =

2002 song by Marie N

Single by Marie N

from the album On a Journey
- Released: 2002
- Genre: Disco; house
- Length: 3:01
- Label: Baltic
- Songwriters: Marija Naumova; Marats Samauskis

Marie N singles chronology
"I Wanna" (2002)	"I Feel Good" (2003)

Eurovision Song Contest 2002 entry
- Country: Latvia
- Artist: Marija Naumova
- As: Marie N
- Language: English
- Composer: Marija Naumova
- Lyricists: Marija Naumova; Marats Samauskis

Finals performance
- Final result: 1st
- Final points: 176

Entry chronology
- ◄ "Too Much" (2001)
- "Hello From Mars" (2003) ►

Official performance video
- "I Wanna" on YouTube

"I Wanna" is a song composed and recorded by Latvian singer Marie N with lyrics written by herself and Marats Samauskis. It represented Latvia in the Eurovision Song Contest 2002 held in Tallinn, resulting in the country's only ever win at the contest.

== Background ==
=== Conception ===
"I Wanna", initially titled as "I Wonna", was composed and recorded by Marie N, with lyrics by herself and Marats Samauskis. The lyrics are relatively simple, with the singer telling her lover that she wants to control their relationship.

=== Eurovision ===
On 2 March 2002, "I Wonna" performed by Marie N competed in Eirodziesma 2002, the national final organised by Latvijas Televīzija (LTV) to select its song and performer for the 47th edition of the Eurovision Song Contest. The song won the competition so it became the Latvian entry –and Marie N the performer– for Eurovision.

On 25 May 2002, the Eurovision Song Contest was held at the Saku Suurhall in Tallinn hosted by Eesti Televisioon (ETV), and broadcast live throughout the continent. Marie N performed "I Wanna" twenty-third on the evening, following Slovenia's "Samo ljubezen" by Sestre and preceding Lithuania's "Happy You" by Aivaras.

At the close of voting, the song had received 176 points, placing first in a field of twenty-four, winning the contest. It marked Latvia's first –and only to date– win in the contest.

The song is memorable for Marie's performance. She began wearing a suit –black in Eirodziesma, white in Eurovision– and a trilby hat, which was removed by one of her dancers. As the song continued, other dancers removed her suit jacket and her shirt, revealing the top of a red dress. The suit trousers were then removed, revealing the bottom half of the short dress. On the final beat of the song, the hem was pulled, revealing the dress to be much longer. This visual performance was also supported by a salsa-style song, which made full use of the more up-beat tempos increasingly finding success in the contests. The song, however, was a commercial failure both in Latvia and Europe.

== Track listing ==
CD single
No.	Title	Length
1.	"I Wanna" (Radio Version)	3:01
2.	"I Wanna" (Pedro Pub Mix)	3:32
3.	"I Wanna" (Salsa Version)	3:44
4.	"I Wanna" (Marie N Featuring DJ Dust)	3:46
5.	"I Wanna" (Dance Mix)	4:01

== Charts ==
=== Weekly charts ===
Chart (2002)	Peak position
Belgium (Ultratip Bubbling Under Flanders)	15

Preceded by "Everybody" by Tanel Padar, Dave Benton & 2XL	Eurovision Song Contest winners 2002	Succeeded by "Everyway That I Can" by Sertab Erener
