= Slovenia in the Eurovision Song Contest 2002 =

- Eurovision Song Contest 2002
- Participating broadcaster: Radiotelevizija Slovenija (RTVSLO)
- Country: Slovenia
- Selection process: Evrovizijska Melodija 2002
- Selection date: 16 February 2002

Competing entry
- Song: "Samo ljubezen"
- Artist: Sestre
- Songwriters: Robert Pešut; Barbara Pešut

Placement
- Final result: 13th, 33 points

Participation chronology

Slovenia was represented at the Eurovision Song Contest 2002 with the song "Samo ljubezen", composed by Robert Pešut, with lyrics by Barbara Pešut, and performed by the drag act Sestre. The Slovene participating broadcaster, Radiotelevizija Slovenija (RTVSLO), held the national final Evrovizijska Melodija 2002 in order to select its entry for the contest. 18 entries competed in the national final which consisted of two shows: a semi-final and a final. Entries were selected to advance from the semi-final based on a public televote and a jury panel. Ten entries qualified to compete in the final where "Samo ljubezen" performed by Sestre was selected as the winner following the combination of votes from two thematical juries.

Slovenia competed in the Eurovision Song Contest which took place on 25 May 2002. Performing during the show in position 22, Slovenia placed thirteenth out of the 24 participating countries, scoring 33 points.

== Background ==
Prior to the 2002 contest, Radiotelevizija Slovenija (RTVSLO) had participated in the Eurovision Song Contest representing Slovenia seven times since its first entry in 1993. Its highest placing in the contest, to this point, has been seventh place, achieved on two occasions: in 1995 with the song "Prisluhni mi" performed by Darja Švajger, and in 2001 with the song "Energy" performed by Nuša Derenda. Its only other top ten result was achieved in 1997 when "Zbudi se" performed by Tanja Ribič placed tenth.

As part of its duties as participating broadcaster, RTVSLO organises the selection of its entry in the Eurovision Song Contest and broadcasts the event in the country. The broadcaster has traditionally selected its entry through a national final entitled Evrovizijska Melodija (EMA), which has been produced with variable formats. For 2002, RTVSLO opted to organise Evrovizijska Melodija 2002 (EMA 2002) to select its entry.

== Before Eurovision ==
=== Evrovizijska Melodija 2002 ===
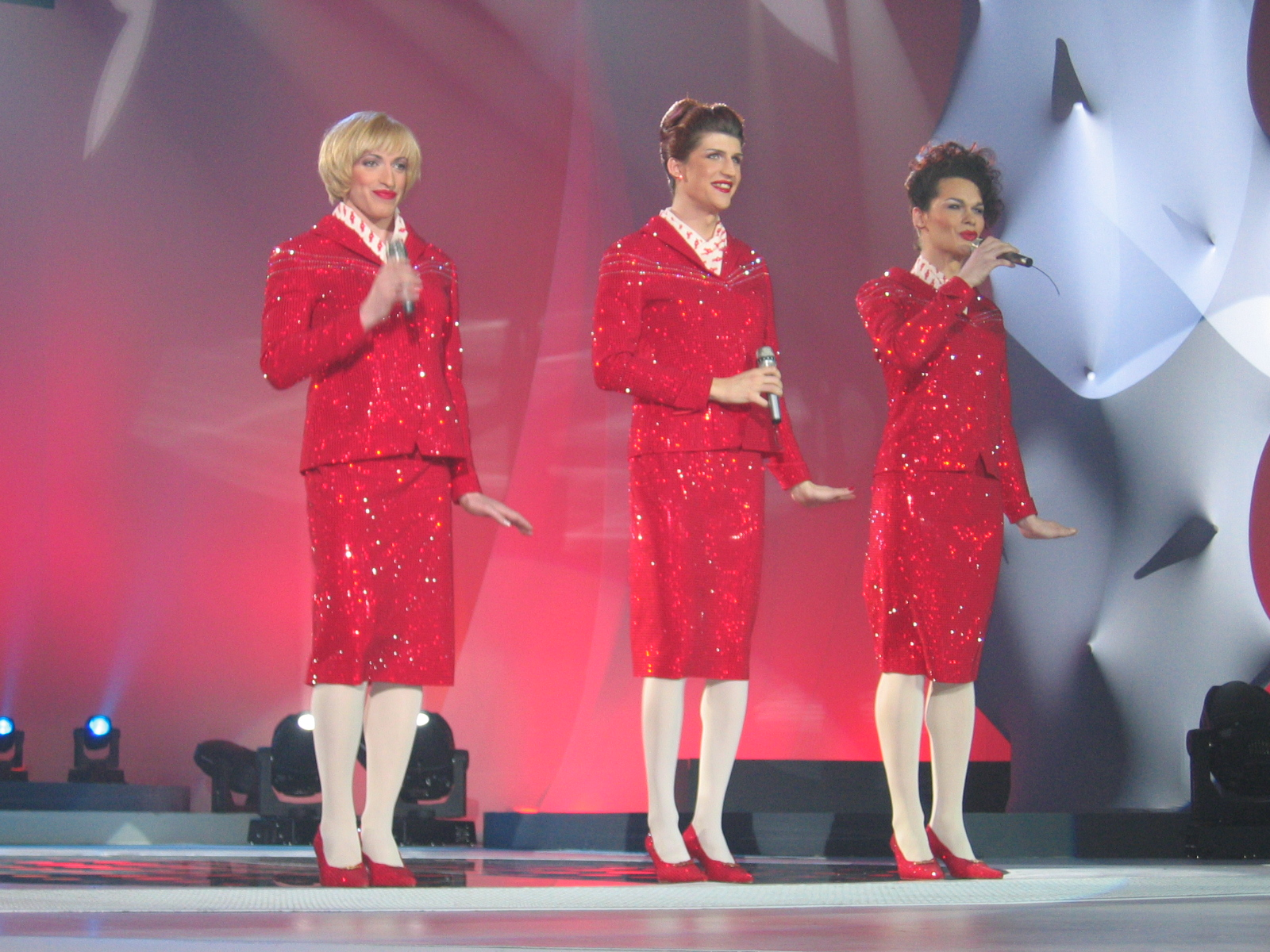
Sestre performing at EMA 2002

Evrovizijska Melodija 2002 (EMA 2002) was the seventh edition of the national final format Evrovizijska Melodija (EMA). The competition was used by RTVSLO to select its entry for the Eurovision Song Contest 2002, and consisted of two shows on 15 and 16 February 2002. The broadcaster held both shows of the competition at its Studio 1 in Ljubljana and were broadcast on TV SLO1.

==== Format ====
The format of the competition consisted of two televised shows: a semi-final held on 15 February 2002 and a final held on 16 February 2002. Eighteen songs competed in the semi-final where a public televote first selected the top five entries to proceed to the final. An expert jury then selected an additional five finalists out of the thirteen remaining songs. Ten songs competed in the final where the winner was selected by two thematical juries. Each jury group assigned points as follows: 1–8, 10 and 12, with the song that received the highest overall score when the votes were combined being determined the winner.

==== Competing entries ====
Artists and composers were able to submit their entries to the broadcaster until 25 October 2001. 75 entries were received by the broadcaster during the submission period. An expert committee consisting of Mojmir Sepe (conductor and composer), Aleš Strajnar (musician and composer), Jaka Pucihar (composer), Aleksander Radić (Head of the Slovenian delegation at the Eurovision Song Contest) and Peter Juratovec (television director) selected eighteen artists and songs for the competition from the received submissions. The competing artists were announced on 23 November 2001. Among the competing artists was former Slovenian Eurovision contestant Regina who represented Slovenia in 1996.

Artist	Song	Songwriter(s)
Alenka Šmid-Čena	"Plamen v temi"	Boštjan Groznik, Alenka Šmid-Čena
Ana Dežman	"Pelji me, kjer sem doma"	Patrik Greblo, Milan Dekleva
Andraž Hribar	"Moja moja"	Andraž Hribar, Milan Hribar
Anika	"Če ni ljubezni"	Matjaž Zupan
Botri	"Angelina"	Franci Zabukovec
Damjana Golavšek	"Vsako življenje gre svojo pot"	Karel Novak, Damjana Golavšek
Deja Mušič	"Shangri-La"	Sewer Nuhi, Deja Mušič
Faraoni	"Imej me vedno s seboj"	Enzo Hrovatin
Gianni Rijavec	"Baby Blue"	Gianni Rijavec
Irena Vrčkovnik	"V ritmu, ki me lovi"	Bor Zuljan, Leon Oblak
Karmen Stavec	"Še in še"	Martin Štibernik, Karmen Stavec
Katrinas	"Ocean"	Rok Golob, Marija Trampuž
Manca and NORDunk	"Zdravilo sveta"	Bojan Logar, Branimir Korošec
Monika Pučelj	"Mi paše"	Danilo Kocjančič, Drago Mislej-Mef
Polona	"Oblaki"	Marino Legovič, Damjana Kenda Hussu
Regina	"Ljubezen daje moč"	Aleksander Kogoj
Rok 'n' Band	"Slika brez pozdrava"	Dare Petrič, Rok Ferengja, Mišo Radovančevič, Damjan Kuzmijak
Sestre	"Samo ljubezen"	Robert Pešut, Barbara Pešut

==== Semi-final ====
The semi-final of EMA 2002 took place on 15 February 2002, hosted by Andrea F. and former Slovenian Eurovision entrants Darja Švajger (1995 and 1999) and Nuša Derenda (2001). The eighteen competing entries first faced a public televote where the top five proceeded to the final; an additional five qualifiers were then selected out of the remaining thirteen entries by an expert jury.

Public vote qualifier Jury qualifier

Semi-final – 15 February 2002
R/O	Artist	Song	Televote	Place	Result
1	Katrinas	"Ocean"	2,340	6	—N/a
2	Irena Vrčkovnik	"V ritmu, ki me lovi"	1,607	11	—N/a
3	Alenka Šmid-Čena	"Plamen v temi"	810	17	—N/a
4	Manca and NORDunk	"Zdravilo sveta"	894	16	Qualified
5	Monika Pučelj	"Mi paše"	1,949	8	Qualified
6	Gianni Rijavec	"Baby Blue"	1,727	10	—N/a
7	Sestre	"Samo ljubezen"	4,085	3	Qualified
8	Deja Mušič	"Shangri-La"	463	18	—N/a
9	Polona	"Oblaki"	1,280	13	Qualified
10	Regina	"Ljubezen daje moč"	2,260	7	—N/a
11	Botri	"Angelina"	1,253	14	Qualified
12	Damjana Golavšek	"Vsako življenje gre svojo pot"	1,117	15	—N/a
13	Ana Dežman	"Pelji me, kjer sem doma"	1,286	12	Qualified
14	Anika	"Če ni ljubezni"	1,912	9	—N/a
15	Karmen Stavec	"Še in še"	13,776	1	Qualified
16	Andraž Hribar	"Moja moja"	3,639	5	Qualified
17	Rok 'n' Band	"Slika brez pozdrava"	3,787	4	Qualified
18	Faraoni	"Imej me vedno s seboj"	4,822	2	Qualified

==== Final ====
The final of EMA 2002 took place on 16 February 2002 and was hosted by Miša Molk and Andrea F. In addition to the performances of the competing entries, Ines (who represented Estonia in 2000) performed as a guest. The points from two thematical juries selected "Samo ljubezen" performed by Sestre as the winner. The juries consisted of experts and representatives of the entertainment programme of RTVSLO. A public televote was also held during the show and originally had a weighting equal to the votes of a single jury, however its results were announced to have been invalidated in its entirety on 19 February as the voting lines were open for eight minutes instead of five as prescribed. Karmen Stavec was the winner of the televote with 31,944 votes, with Sestre was only ranked sixth by the televote with 8,454 votes.

Final – 16 February 2002
R/O	Artist	Song	Juries		Total	Place
R/O	Artist	Song	Expert	RTVSLO	Total	Place
1	Manca and NORDunk	"Zdravilo sveta"	8	4	12	6
2	Monika Pučelj	"Mi paše"	5	8	13	4
3	Sestre	"Samo ljubezen"	12	12	24	1
4	Polona	"Oblaki"	10	7	17	2
5	Botri	"Angelina"	2	3	5	8
6	Ana Dežman	"Pelji me, kjer sem doma"	7	6	13	4
7	Karmen Stavec	"Še in še"	6	10	16	3
8	Andraž Hribar	"Moja moja"	4	5	9	7
9	Rok 'n' Band	"Slika brez pozdrava"	1	1	2	10
10	Faraoni	"Imej me vedno s seboj"	3	2	5	8

Members of the Jury
Jury	Members
Experts	Mojmir Sepe; Aleš Strajnar; Drago Ivanuša
RTVSLO	Simona Tepeš; Mira Bučar; Anton Natek

=== Controversy ===
The victory of Sestre at EMA 2002 was heavily criticised in Slovenia, mainly due to the votes from the two juries being sufficient in determining the final winner. A group of Slovenian singers, composers and record labels published a protest letter following the competition threatening to never again appear at any event organised by the entertainment department of RTVSLO, while questions were also raised in the country's parliament regarding the broadcaster's image as the controversy garnered international media attention. A new voting round was planned to be held with the winner being exclusively determined by public televoting, but this did not materialise and Sestre ultimately remained as the Slovenian Eurovision representative.

== At Eurovision ==
The Eurovision Song Contest 2002 took place at Saku Suurhall in Tallinn, Estonia, on 25 May 2002. The participants list included the previous year's winning country, the "Big Four" countries, consisting of France, Germany, Spain, and the United Kingdom, any eligible countries which did not compete in the 2001 contest, and countries which had obtained the highest average points total at the previous year's contest, up to 24 total participants. According to Eurovision rules, all nations with the exceptions of the bottom six countries in the 2001 contest competed in the final. On 9 November 2001, an allocation draw was held which determined the running order and Slovenia was set to perform in position 22, following the entry from Romania and before the entry from Latvia. Slovenia finished in thirteenth place with 33 points.

The show was televised in Slovenia on TV SLO1.

=== Voting ===
Below is a breakdown of points awarded to Slovenia and awarded by Slovenia in the contest. The nation awarded its 12 points to Croatia in the contest. RTVSLO appointed Nuša Derenda (who represented who represented Slovenia in 2001) as its spokesperson to announce the Slovenian votes during the show.

Points awarded to Slovenia
Score	Country
12 points	
10 points	
8 points	Croatia
7 points	Spain
6 points	United Kingdom
5 points	France
4 points	
3 points	
2 points	Austria; Macedonia; Switzerland
1 point	Bosnia and Herzegovina

Points awarded by Slovenia
Score	Country
12 points	Croatia
10 points	Malta
8 points	United Kingdom
7 points	Sweden
6 points	Estonia
5 points	Latvia
4 points	Cyprus
3 points	France
2 points	Bosnia and Herzegovina
1 point	Switzerland
