= Slovenia in the Eurovision Song Contest 1998 =

- Eurovision Song Contest 1998
- Participating broadcaster: Radiotelevizija Slovenija (RTVSLO)
- Country: Slovenia
- Selection process: Evrovizijska Melodija 1998
- Selection date: 28 February 1998

Competing entry
- Song: "Naj bogovi slišijo"
- Artist: Vili Resnik
- Songwriters: Matjaž Vlašič; Urša Vlašič

Placement
- Final result: 18th, 17 points

Participation chronology

Slovenia was represented at the Eurovision Song Contest 1998 with the song "Naj bogovi slišijo" composed by Matjaž Vlašič, with lyrics by Urša Vlašič, and performed by Vili Resnik. The Slovene participating broadcaster, Radiotelevizija Slovenija (RTVSLO), held the national final Evrovizijska Melodija 1998 in order to select its entry for the contest. 14 entries competed in the national final where "Naj bogovi slišijo" performed by Vili Resnik was selected as the winner entirely by a public televote.

Slovenia competed in the Eurovision Song Contest which took place on 9 May 1998. Performing during the show in position 12, Slovenia placed eighteenth out of the 25 participating countries, scoring 17 points.

== Background ==
Prior to the 1998 contest, Radiotelevizija Slovenija (RTVSLO) had participated in the Eurovision Song Contest representing Slovenia four times since its first entry in 1993. Its highest placing in the contest, to this point, has been seventh place, achieved in in 1995 with the song "Prisluhni mi" performed by Darja Švajger. Its only other top ten result was achieved in 1997 when "Zbudi" performed by Tanja Ribič placed tenth.

As part of its duties as participating broadcaster, RTVSLO organises the selection of its entry in the Eurovision Song Contest and broadcasts the event in the country. The broadcaster has traditionally selected its entry through a national final entitled Evrovizijska Melodija (EMA), which has been produced with variable formats. For 1998, the broadcaster opted to organise Evrovizijska Melodija 1998 (EMA 1998) to select its entry.

== Before Eurovision ==
=== Evrovizijska Melodija 1998 ===
Evrovizijska Melodija 1998 (EMA 1998) was the fourth edition of the national final format Evrovizijska Melodija (EMA). The competition was used by RTVSLO to select its entry for the Eurovision Song Contest 1998 and took place on 28 February 1998 at its Studio 1 in Ljubljana. The show was hosted by Mojca Mavec and was broadcast on TV SLO 1 as well as online via the broadcaster's website rtvslo.si.

==== Competing entries ====
An expert committee consisting of Miša Molk (Head of Entertainment and Sports at RTVSLO), Mojmir Sepe (conductor and composer) and Andrej Karoli (music editor for Radio Slovenija) was tasked to select the entries for the competition from 43 received submissions. However, additional artists and composers were later directly invited by the broadcaster to submit entries due to the poor quality of the previously submitted songs. Fourteen artists and songs were ultimately selected from those received through both entry methods and among the competing artists were former Slovenian Eurovision contestants Darja Švajger who represented Slovenia in 1995 and Regina who represented Slovenia in 1996.

==== Final ====
EMA 1998 took place on 28 February 1998. In addition to the performances of the competing entries, Tanja Ribič, who represented Slovenia in 1997, performed as a guest. A public televote selected "Naj bogovi slišijo" performed by Vili Resnik as the winner.

Final – 28 February 1998
R/O	Artist	Song	Songwriter(s)	Televote	Place
1	Magnifico	"Silvia"	Robert Magnifico	3,558	5
2	Vili Resnik	"Naj bogovi slišijo"	Matjaž Vlašič, Urša Vlašič	7,391	1
3	Pop Design	"Nora noč"	Tone Košmrlj	911	13
4	Miran Rudan	"Cvetje in vrtovi"	Tone Košmrlj, Miran Rudan	1,377	10
5	Aurora	"Pesem zate"	Dean Savič, Dragan Kikovič	480	14
6	Obvezna smer	"Ko pade noč"	Martin Štibernik, Karmen Stavec	980	12
7	Damjana	"Ljubim, ljubiš"	Karel Novak, Janez Zmazek	1,448	9
8	Karmen Stavec and Patrik Greblo	"Kje pesem je doma"	Patrik Greblo, Milan Dekleva	2,298	7
9	Sound Attack	"Zakaj odšel si"	Simon Šurev, Pika Božič	1,628	8
10	Deja Mušič	"Ljubezen"	Boštjan Grabnar, Deja Mušič, Danijel Šmid	1,257	11
11	Gianni Rijavec and Vladimir Čadež	"Pusti času čas"	Gianni Rijavec, Miša Čermak	6,103	2
12	Darja Švajger	"Ljubezen ne odhaja"	Rok Golob, Darja Švajger	3,224	6
13	Regina	"Glas gora"	Aleksander Kogoj	5,694	3
14	Victory	"Zapri oči"	Robi Lukač	4,221	4

== At Eurovision ==
According to Eurovision rules, all nations with the exceptions of the eight countries which had obtained the lowest average number of points over the last five contests competed in the final on 9 May 1998. On 13 November 1997, an allocation draw was held which determined the running order and Slovenia was set to perform in position 12, following the entry from Hungary and before the entry from Ireland. The Slovenian conductor at the contest was Mojmir Sepe, and Slovenia finished in nineteenth place with 17 points.

The show was televised in Slovenia on TV SLO 1. RTVSLO appointed Mojca Mavec as its spokesperson to announce the Slovenian votes during the show.

=== Voting ===
Below is a breakdown of points awarded to Slovenia and awarded by Slovenia in the contest. The nation awarded its 12 points to Croatia in the contest.

Points awarded to Slovenia
Score	Country
12 points	
10 points	
8 points	
7 points	
6 points	
5 points	Romania
4 points	Finland
3 points	Croatia; Turkey
2 points	Greece
1 point	

Points awarded by Slovenia
Score	Country
12 points	Croatia
10 points	Norway
8 points	Germany
7 points	Israel
6 points	Belgium
5 points	United Kingdom
4 points	Macedonia
3 points	Malta
2 points	Estonia
1 point	Ireland
