= Slovenia in the Eurovision Song Contest 2003 =

- Eurovision Song Contest 2003
- Participating broadcaster: Radiotelevizija Slovenija (RTVSLO)
- Country: Slovenia
- Selection process: Evrovizijska Melodija 2003
- Selection date: 15 February 2003

Competing entry
- Song: "Nanana"
- Artist: Karmen
- Songwriters: Martin Štibernik; Karmen Stavec

Placement
- Final result: 23rd, 7 points

Participation chronology

Slovenia was represented at the Eurovision Song Contest 2003 with the song "Nanana", composed by Martin Štibernik, with lyrics by Karmen Stavec, and performed by Karmen herself. The Slovene participating broadcaster, Radiotelevizija Slovenija (RTVSLO), held the national final Evrovizijska Melodija 2003 in order to select its entry for the contest. Sixteen entries competed in the national final where the winner was selected over two rounds of voting. In the first round, the top three entries were selected following the combination of votes from a five-member jury panel and a public televote. In the second round, "Lep poletni dan" performed by Karmen Stavec was selected as the winner entirely by a public televote. The song was later translated from Slovene to English for Eurovision and was titled "Nanana".

Slovenia competed in the Eurovision Song Contest which took place on 24 May 2003. Performing as the closing entry during the show in position 26, Slovenia placed 23rd out of the 26 participating countries, scoring 7 points.

== Background ==
Prior to the 2003 contest, Radiotelevizija Slovenija (RTVSLO) had participated in the Eurovision Song Contest representing Slovenia eight times since its first entry in 1993. Its highest placing in the contest, to this point, has been seventh place, achieved on two occasions: in 1995 with the song "Prisluhni mi" performed by Darja Švajger, and in 2001 with the song "Energy" performed by Nuša Derenda. Its only other top ten result was achieved in 1997 when "Zbudi se" performed by Tanja Ribič placed tenth. In 2002, "Samo ljubezen" performed by Sestre placed 13th.

As part of its duties as participating broadcaster, RTVSLO organises the selection of its entry in the Eurovision Song Contest and broadcasts the event in the country. The broadcaster has traditionally selected its entry through a national final entitled Evrovizijska Melodija (EMA), which has been produced with variable formats. For 2003, RTVSLO opted to organise Evrovizijska Melodija 2003 (EMA 2003) to select its entry.

== Before Eurovision ==
=== Evrovizijska Melodija 2003 ===
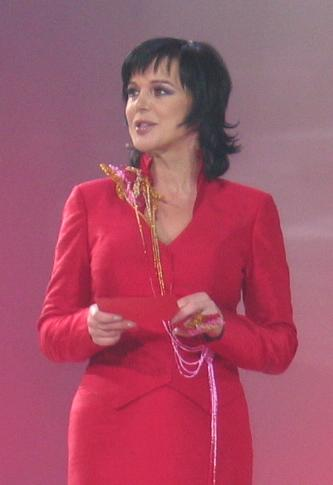
Miša Molk, the presenter of EMA 2003

Evrovizijska Melodija 2002 (EMA 2002) was the eighth edition of the national final format Evrovizijska Melodija (EMA), used by RTVSLO to select its entry for the Eurovision Song Contest 2003. The competition took place at the Gospodarsko razstavišče in Ljubljana, hosted by Miša Molk and Peter Poles and was broadcast on TV SLO 1, Radio Val 202 and online via the broadcaster's website rtvslo.si.

==== Format ====
Sixteen songs competed in a televised show where the winner was selected over two rounds of voting. In the first round, the 50/50 combination of points from a five-member expert jury and a public televote selected three songs out of the sixteen competing songs to proceed to a superfinal. The expert jury and the televote each assigned points as follows: 1-8, 10 and 12, with the top three being determined by the songs that receive the highest overall scores when the votes were combined. In the superfinal, public televoting exclusively determined the winner.

==== Competing entries ====
An expert committee consisting of Armando Šturman (music editor for Radio Koper), Martin Žvelc (music producer), Branka Kraner (singer) and Aleš Strajnar (musician and composer) selected sixteen artists and songs for the competition from 88 received submissions. The competing artists were announced on 13 December 2002. Among the competing artists was former Slovenian Eurovision contestant Nuša Derenda who represented Slovenia in 2001.

Artist	Song	Songwriter(s)
Alenka Godec	"Poglej me v oči"	Anja Rupel, Alenka Godec, Aleš Klinar
Alya	"Exploziv(no)"	Cvetka Omladič, Dejan Radičevič
Ana Dežman	"Mlado srce"	Dušan Velkaverh, Jure Robežnik
Andraž Hribar	"Letim naprej"	Dušan Bižal, Andraž Hribar
Bepop	"Ne sekiraj se"	Primož Pogelšek, Zvone Tomac
Domen Kumer	"Tvoje ime"	Frenk Nova, Sebastian
Folkrola and Nina	"Ujemi me"	Samo Javornik
Jadranka Juras	"Sedmi čut"	Štefan Miljevič, Jadranka Juras
Jasmina Cafnik	"Ti sploh ne razumeš"	Drago Mislej, Danilo Kocjančič
Karmen Stavec	"Lep poletni dan"	Martin Štibernik, Karmen Stavec
Marijan Novina	"Vse enkrat mine"	Marijan Novina
Nuša Derenda	"Prvič in zadnjič"	Urša Vlašič, Matjaž Vlašič
Pika Božič	"Ne bom čakala te"	Anja Rupel, Pika Božič, Aleš Klinar
Platin	"Sto in ena zgodba"	Diana Lečnik, Simon Gomilšek
Polona	"Ujel si se"	Damjana Kenda Hussu, Matija Oražem
Tulio Furlanič and Alenka Pinterič	"Zlata šestdeseta"	Damjana Kenda Hussu, Marino Legovič

==== Final ====
EMA 2003 took place on 15 February 2003. In addition to the performances of the competing entries, Anika Horvat, Manca Izmajlova, Monika Pučelj, Natalija Verboten, and Marija Naumova who won Eurovision for Latvia in 2002, performed as guests. The winner was selected over two rounds of voting. In the first round, three entries were selected to proceed to the second round based on the combination of points from a five-member jury panel and a public televote. The jury consisted of Naumova, Andi Knoll (Austrian commentator for the Eurovision Song Contest), Paul de Leeuw (Dutch comedian and singer), Drago Ivanuša (composer and musician) and Branka Kraner (singer). In the second round, a public televote selected "Lep poletni dan" performed by Karmen Stavec as the winner.

Final – 15 February 2003
R/O	Artist	Song	Jury	Televote		Total	Place
R/O	Artist	Song	Jury	Votes	Points	Total	Place
1	Jadranka Juras	"Sedmi čut"	1	920	0	1	12
2	Ana Dežman	"Mlado srce"	0	1,532	3	3	11
3	Folkrola and Nina	"Ujemi me"	0	878	0	0	13
4	Bepop	"Ne sekiraj se"	0	16,695	12	12	4
5	Andraž Hribar	"Letim naprej"	5	892	0	5	10
6	Karmen Stavec	"Lep poletni dan"	6	9,194	10	16	2
7	Nuša Derenda	"Prvič in zadnjič"	7	5,798	8	15	3
8	Alya	"Exploziv(no)"	0	924	0	0	13
9	Marijan Novina	"Vse enkrat mine"	2	1,791	4	6	9
10	Pika Božič	"Ne bom čakala te"	3	5,207	7	10	6
11	Platin	"Sto in ena zgodba"	0	747	0	0	13
12	Jasmina Cafnik	"Ti sploh ne razumeš"	0	677	0	0	13
13	Domen Kumer	"Tvoje ime"	4	2,237	5	9	7
14	Polona	"Ujel si se"	10	1,422	2	12	4
15	Tulio Furlanič and Alenka Pinterič	"Zlata šestdeseta"	8	1,246	1	9	7
16	Alenka Godec	"Poglej me v oči"	12	2,640	6	18	1

Superfinal – 15 February 2003
R/O	Artist	Song	Televote	Place
1	Karmen Stavec	"Lep poletni dan"	26,714	1
2	Nuša Derenda	"Prvič in zadnjič"	13,637	2
3	Alenka Godec	"Poglej me v oči"	12,261	3

== At Eurovision ==
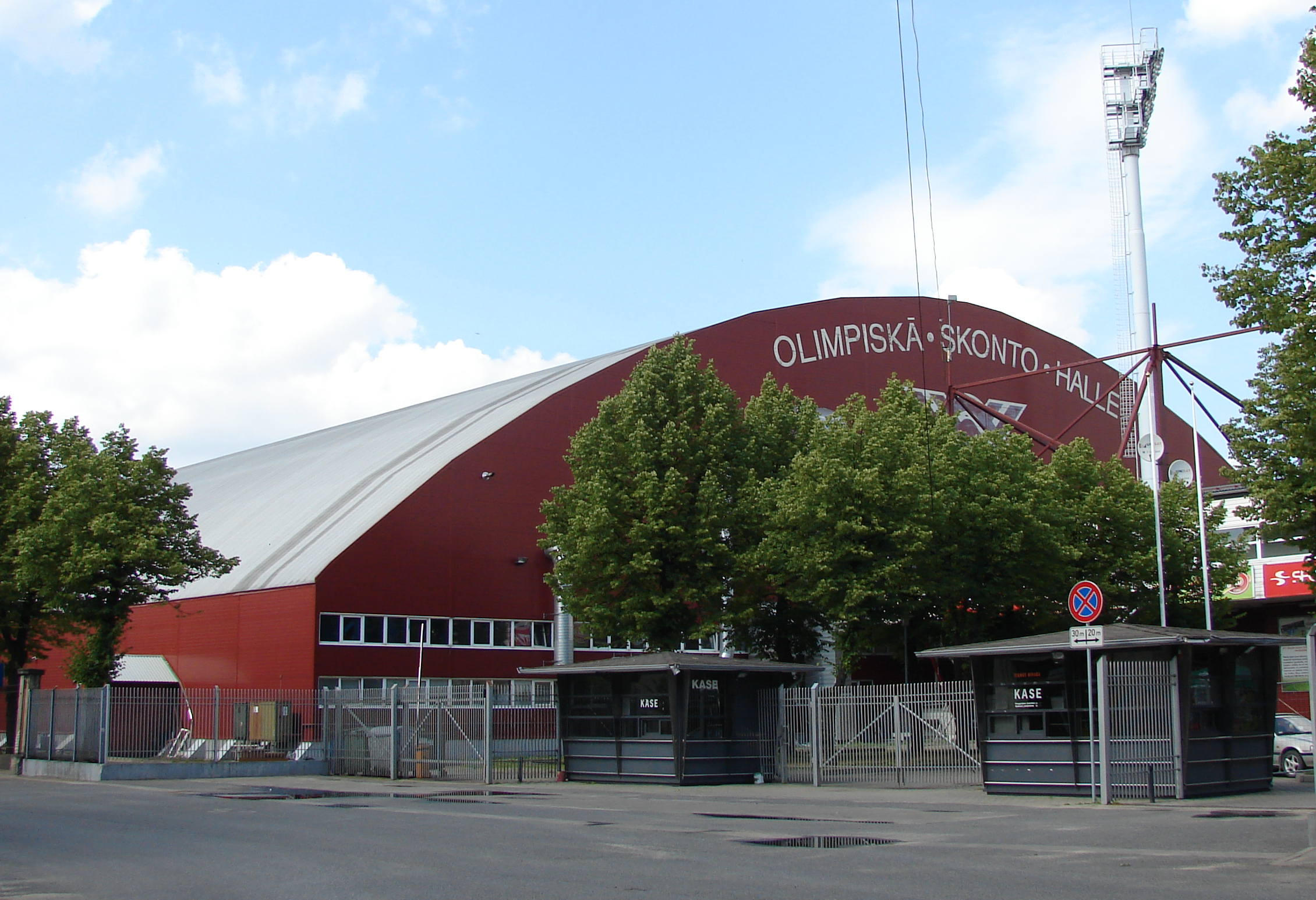
The Eurovision Song Contest 2003 took place at Skonto Hall in Riga, Latvia.

The Eurovision Song Contest 2003 took place at the Skonto Hall in Riga, Latvia, on 24 May 2003. According to the Eurovision rules, the participant list for the contest was composed of the winning country from the previous year's contest, any countries which had not participated in the previous year's contest, and those which had obtained the highest placing in the previous contest, up to the maximum 26 participants in total. The draw for running order had previously been held on 29 November 2002 in Riga, with the results being revealed during a delayed broadcast of the proceedings later that day. Slovenia was set to close the show and perform in position 26, following the entry from Sweden. At the contest, Karmen performed the English version of "Lep poletni dan", titled "Nanana". The nation finished in 23rd place with 7 points, consisting of four received from Bosnia and Herzegovina and three from Croatia. In Slovenia, the show was televised on TV SLO 2 with commentary by Andrea F.

=== Voting ===
Televoting was an obligatory voting method for all participating countries. Point values of 1–8, 10 and 12 were awarded to the 10 most popular songs of the televote, in ascending order. Countries voted in the same order as they had performed. Below is a breakdown of points awarded to and by Slovenia in the contest. RTVSLO appointed Peter Poles as its spokesperson to announce the results of the Slovenian televote during the show.

Slovenia gave the decisive votes of the contest: it was the last country to vote, and at that point, Belgium was leading Turkey by five points at the top of the scoreboard. Slovenia proceeded to give 3 points to Belgium, 10 to Turkey, and 12 to third place Russia, giving Turkey the final victory.

Points awarded to Slovenia
Score	Country
12 points	
10 points	
8 points	
7 points	
6 points	
5 points	
4 points	Bosnia and Herzegovina
3 points	Croatia
2 points	
1 point	

Points awarded by Slovenia
Score	Country
12 points	Russia
10 points	Turkey
8 points	Croatia
7 points	Austria
6 points	Sweden
5 points	Norway
4 points	Iceland
3 points	Belgium
2 points	Ireland
1 point	Spain
