= Pešut =

Pešut (Anglicized: Pesut, Peshut) is a Serbo-Croatian surname. The surname has its root in Herzegovina, members of the family belong to the Serbian Orthodox Church (Serbs) and the Roman Catholic Church (Croats). Most members in Croatia are concentrated in the Lika region, Karlovac County and Sisak, descendants are also found in whole Slovenia, Montenegro, Bosnia-Herzegovina and Serbia.

== Notables ==
- Robert Pešut-Magnifico, Slovenian musician
- George Pesut, Canadian hockeyplayer

== See also ==
- Pesut
