= Richard Mohaupt =

German composer and Kapellmeister (1904–1957)

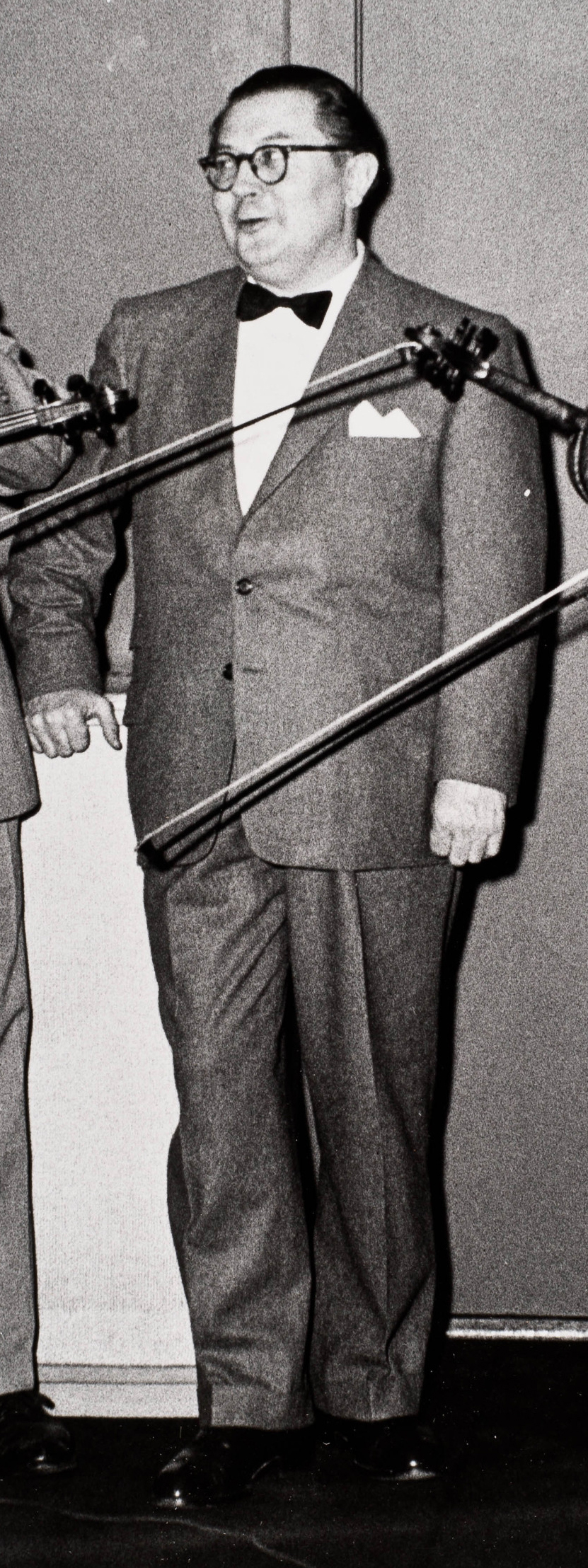
Richard Mohaupt, New York, 1954

Richard Mohaupt (14 September 1904 – 3 July 1957) was a German composer and Kapellmeister.

== Life and career ==
Richard Mohaupt was born in Breslau, where he studied music at Breslau University with Julius Prüwer and Rudolf Bilke. After his studies he worked as a répétiteur and music director at opera houses in Breslau, Aachen and Weimar. After a concert tour as pianist and conductor through the Soviet Union in 1931–1932, he settled Berlin in 1932 where he began working for the UFA film company. Four years later he had his first success with his ballet Die Gaunerstreiche der Courasche. The work was performed during the ballet festival which was part of the supporting programme of the 1936 Summer Olympics in Berlin, but shortly after this success the Nazis denounced him with the expression "Music Bolshevism" and he was excluded from the Reichsmusikkammer. With this exclusion Richard Mohaupt could not work in Germany anymore and so emigrated to the US in 1939 and settled in New York.

During his time in the United States Mohaupt composed for a variety of mediums, including opera, ballet, film, radio, television and orchestral music. Two of his works became very popular during the 1940s and 1950s: the 1939 orchestral work Stadtpfeifermusik (Town Piper Music) and his 1944 opera Die Bremer Stadtmusikanten; the latter of which premiered at Theater Bremen in 1949. He wrote one other opera while in America: Double Trouble, which premiered at the Kentucky Opera in 1954. While in America, Mohaupt also composed music for the ballets Max und Moritz (a "dance-burlesque" composed in 1945, 1949 premiere by Karlsruhe ballet) and The Legend of the Charlatan (1949, premiered in New York). His works were performed by renowned American orchestras like the New York Philharmonic and the NBC Symphony Orchestra.

Mohaupt created his last opera, Der grüne Kakadu, after moving back to Europe in 1955 where he ultimately settled in Austria. This opera used a libretto by Arthur Schnitzler and had its 1958 world premiere at the Hamburg State Opera shortly after Mohaupt's death in Reichenau an der Rax, Austria on 3 July 1957.

== Compositions ==
=== Operas ===
- Die Wirtin von Pinsk (world premiere 1938 in Dresden, revised 1956)
- Die Bremer Stadtmusikanten (world premiere 1949 in Bremen)
- Double-Trouble or Die Zwillings-Komödie (world premiere 1954 in Louisville, Kentucky)
- Der grüne Kakadu (world premiere 1958 in Hamburg)

=== Ballets ===
- Die Gaunerstreiche der Courasche (after Grimmelshausen; world premiere 1936 in Berlin)
- Max und Moritz (after Wilhelm Busch; world premiere 1949 in Karlsruhe)
- Der Weiberstreik von Athen (after Lysistrata; world premiere 1957 in Karlsruhe)

=== Orchestral works ===
- Drei Episoden (world premiere 1938 in Amsterdam)
- Concerto for piano and orchestra (world premiere 1938 in Warsaw; world premiere of the revised version at the IGNM festival in Frankfurt/Main in 1951)
- Town Piper Music (world premiere 1941 in New York)
- Symphony No. 1 "Rhythm and Variations" (world premiere 1942 in New York)
- Concerto for Orchestra (Based on Red Army Themes) (world premiere 1943 in New York)
- Concerto for violin and orchestra (world premiere 1954 in New York)
- Banchetto musicale (world premiere 1956 in Berlin)
