= Regina (Slovenian singer) =

Yugoslav singer

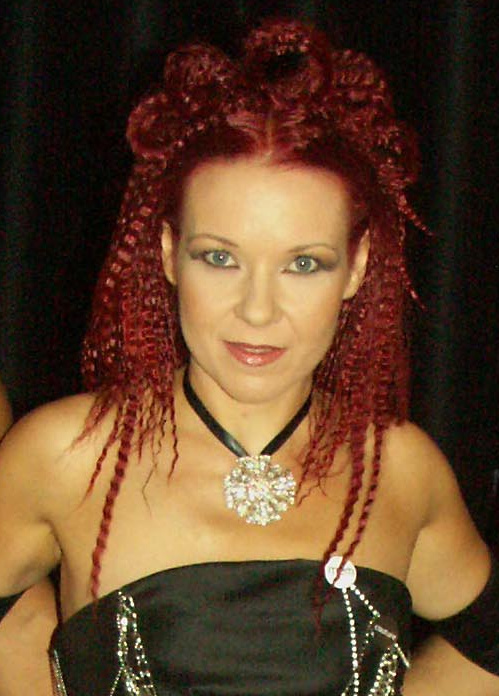
- Regina (Slovenian song festival 2005)

Background information
- Born: Irena Jalsoveč; 4 July 1965 (age 60); Murska Sobota, SR Slovenia, SFR Yugoslavia
- Genres: Rock, Jazz
- Occupation: Singer
- Instrument: Vocals
- Years active: 1988–present
- Website: Regina

Regina (born Irena Jalšovec, 4 July 1965, Murska Sobota, Yugoslavia — now Slovenia) is a Slovenian singer, best known for her participation in the Eurovision Song Contest 1996.

== Pop workshop ==
Regina has made 3 appearances in the Pop workshop (Pop delavnica).

- 1988: Vem
- 1989: Ne vabi me
- 1993: Srečo ti želim

== Yamaha ==
Regina appeared with the song Joey. She achieved 4th place.

== EMA (Slovenia) ==
Regina has made eight appearances in the Slovenian Eurovision Song Contest selection, EMA, as follows:

- 1993: Naj ljubezen združi vse ljudi (Aleksander Kogoj – Aleksander Kogoj – Mojmir Sepe) – 4th (70 points)
- 1996: Dan najlepših sanj (Aleksander Kogoj – Aleksander Kogoj – Jože Privšek) – 1st (118 points)
- 1998: Glas gora (Aleksander Kogoj – Aleksander Kogoj – Aleksander Kogoj) – 3rd (5.694 televotes)
- 2001: Zaljubljena v maj (Aleksander Kogoj – Marko Slokar – Patrik Greblo) – 8th (6 points)
- 2002: Ljubezen daje moč (Aleksander Kogoj – Aleksander Kogoj – Sašo Fajon)
- 2004: Plave očij (Aleksander Kogoj – Feri Lainšček – Tomaž Kozlevčar) – 10th (3 points)
- 2005: Proti vetru (Aleksander Kogoj, Damjan Pančur – Feri Lainšček – Damjan Pančur) – critics' award, 9th (2.514 televotes)
- 2016: Alive in Every Way (Aleksander Kogoj, Jon Dobrun – Jon Dobrun – Aleksander Kogoj)

The success of "Dan najlepših sanj" in 1996 earned Regina the right to represent Slovenia in the Eurovision Song Contest 1996. The song survived the audio-only pre-qualifying round held in March that year, but at the contest itself, held in Oslo on 18 May, could only manage to place 21st of the 23 entries.

Points	Country
8	Bosnia and Herzegovina
6	Croatia
1	Spain, Iceland

== Slovenian song festival ==
- 1998: Sončna ljubezen
- 1999: Ujemi moj nasmeh – award for the best production
- 2000: Moje ime – 3rd, winner in the opinion of the jury, award for the best representation of the music video (with Gloria)
- 2002: Moja zemlja
- 2003: Čaša ljubezni – with Diego Barrios Ross
- 2005: Gabriel – 10th (1034 telephone votes)
- 2006: Demoni
- 2009: Poljubi me – 8th (477 telephone votes)
- 2011: Tebe ni – 6th (7 points)

== Albums discography ==
Regina has released ten albums.

- Regina (1988)
- Novo leto
- Ave Maria (1991)
- Liza ljubi jazz (1994)

Liza ljubi jazz, Smoke on the water, Style, DD & D, Be a woman, Tokyo night, Čarovnik, Joey, Šok, Srečo ti želim AND Naj ljubezen združi vse ljudi

- Religija ljubezni (1995)

Religija ljubezni, Bodi tu, Anergija, Anergija (disco mix), Am ban pet podgan, Pravljična ljubezen, Party za ples, Čakam te, Canzonni, Bodi tu, Religija ljubezni (dance mix), Fido, Heidi, Religija ljubezni (karaoke), Anergija (karaoke), Bodi tu (karaoke) AND Pravljična ljubezen (karaoke)

- Dan najlepših sanj – Eurosong '96 – Slovenian entry (1996)

Dan najlepših sanj, The brightest day, Liza ljubi jazz, Bodi tu, Be a woman AND Dan najlepših sanj (karaoke)

- Dan najlepših sanj

Dan najlepših sanj, Bodi tu, Pravljična ljubezen, Religija ljubezni, Be a woman, Naj ljubezen združi vse ljudi, Am ban pet podgan, Čakam te, Heidi AND Dan najlepših sanj (karaoke)

- Moje ime (2000) (HER BEST-SELLING ALBUM)

Moje ime (Aleksander Kogoj), Glas gora, Ne ori, Ujemi moj nasmeh (Aleksander Kogoj, Milan Dekleva AND Sašo Fajon), Sončna ljubezen (Aleksander Kogoj, Hana Štupar AND Patrik Greblo), Dan najlepših sanj, Naj ljubezen združi vse ljudi, Liza ljubi jazz, Pravljična ljubezen AND Bodi tu

- Čaša ljubezi (2003)

Čaša ljubezni (with Diego Barrios Ross) (Aleksander Kogoj, Štefan Miljevič AND Aleš Avbelj), Zaljubljena v maj, Moja zemlja (Aleksander Kogoj AND Štefan Miljevič), Mama, Novo leto, Ljubezen daje moč, Moj medvedek, Razprla bom dlani, Ne ori, Daleč gre srce (with Alexander Brown) AND En sam utrip

- Tebe pa ni (2012)

Tebe pa ni (Aleksander Kogoj, Damjan Pančur, Feri Lainšček AND Lojze Krajnčan), Izgubljeni čas, Poljubi me (Damjan Pančur, Aleksander Kogoj, Feri Lainšček AND Tomaž Grintal), Demoni (Damjan Pančur, Aleksander Kogoj, Feri Lainšček AND Aleš Avbelj), Gabriel (Damjan Pančur, Aleksander Kogoj AND Feri Lainšček), Proti vetru, Plave očij, Pozabi me, Dan najlepših sanj (R&B), Moje ime, Glas gora AND Ujemi moj nasmeh

- Ljubezen beži (2015)

Ljubezen beži; Pokliči ljubezen; Ritem ulice

== Compilations ==
- CD Protest
- Slovenska popevka 98
- Daleč je – uglasbena prekmurska poezija (1999)
- EMA 2001
- EMA 2002
- Vroče uspešnice 2002
- Slovenska popevka 2003
- Ema 04
- Ema '05
- Slovenska popevka 2005
- Slovenska popevka 2006
- Festival narečnih popevk 2007
- Slovenska popevka 2009
- Slovenska popevka 2011
- Murske balade in romance (2012)
- Val 202 plus! Vol. 4 (2013)

== Official music videos ==
- 1994: Liza ljubi jazz
- 1995: Bodi tu
- 1996: Dan najlepših sanj
- 1998: Glas gora
- 1999: Ujemi moj nasmeh
- 2000: Moje ime
- 2002: Moja zemlja
- 2003: Čaša ljubezni
- 2004: Plave očij
- 2005: Gabriel
- 2009: Poljubi me
- 2013: Pokliči ljubezen
- 2015: Ljubezen beži

== Music charts in Slovenia ==
Popular songs on the Slovenian music charts were Naj ljubezen združi vse ljudi (Let love unite all the people), Liza ljubi jazz (Liza loves jazz), Dan najlepših sanj (The day of the most beautiful dreams) and Moje ime (My name).

- 1997: Dan najlepših sanj – 19th
- 2000: Moje ime – 37th
- 2007: Dan najlepših sanj – +300th
- 2008: Dan najlepših sanj – 151st
- 2009: Dan najlepših sanj – 194th
- 2010: Dan najlepših sanj – 491st
- 2011: Dan najlepših sanj – 187th
- 2012: Dan najlepših sanj – 417th
- 2013
  - Pokliči ljubezen: 74th
  - Ritem ulice: 98th

== MTV 2005 ==
The official music video of a song Gabriel was premiered on MTV 2005.

== Singles ==
- 1988: Vem
- 1989: Ne vabi me
- 1993: Naj ljubezen združi vse ljudi, Srečo ti želim
- 1994: Liza ljubi jazz
- 1995: Bodi tu, Religija ljubezni
- 1996: Dan najlepših sanj
- 1998: Glas gora, Sončna ljubezen
- 1999: Ujemi moj nasmeh
- 2000: Moje ime
- 2001: Zaljubljena v maj
- 2002: Ljubezen daje moč, Moja zemlja
- 2003: Čaša ljubezni
- 2004: Plave očij
- 2005: Proti vetru, Gabriel
- 2006: Demoni
- 2007: Tvoje očij
- 2008: Dan najlepših sanj (R&B)
- 2009: Poljubi me
- 2010: Izgubljeni čas
- 2011: Tebe ni
- 2012: Tebe pa ni
- 2013: Ritem ulice, Pokliči ljubezen, Moje sanje
- 2015: Ljubezen beži
- 2016: Alive in Every Way, Naglas

== Personal life ==
She is married to Aleksander Kogoj, who has written most of her songs. They have a son together.

Awards and achievements
Preceded by Darja Švajger with "Prisluhni mi"	Slovenia in the Eurovision Song Contest; 1996	Succeeded by Tanja Ribič with "Zbudi se"
