= Rickenbacker 620 =

American guitar model

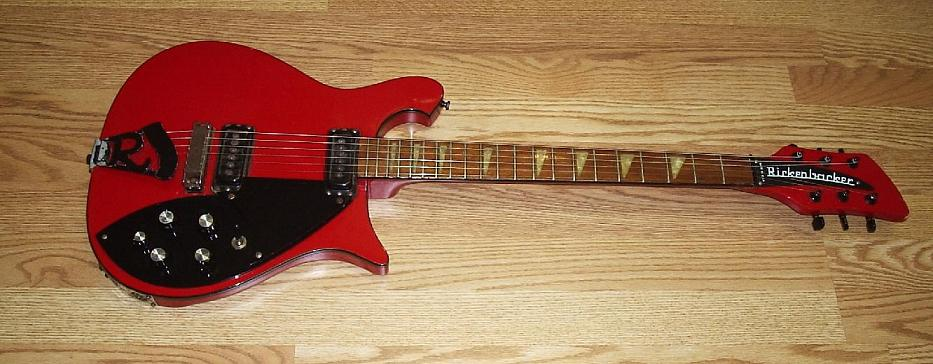
- Manufacturer: Rickenbacker
- Period: Late 1950s - Present

Construction
- Body type: Solid
- Neck joint: Thru body
- Scale: 24.75"

Woods
- Body: Maple
- Neck: Maple
- Fretboard: Rosewood with pearloid triangle inlays

Hardware
- Bridge: Adjustable
- Pickup: 2 Single-coil

Colors available
- Mapleglo (natural), Fireglo (sunburst), Jetglo (black), Midnight Blue

The Rickenbacker 620 is a solid-body guitar manufactured by the Rickenbacker International Corporation (RIC). It is part of the 600 series of guitars which all share the distinctive "cresting wave" styled body. The Rickenbacker 620 features triangular fret markers, a thick rosewood fret board, a maple body with neck-thru construction, maple neck, and the Rickenbacker signature, an 'R' style floating tailpiece. The 620 also comes standard with a stereo output jack. The guitar's pickups are twin single coil 'Hi-gains'. There is a twelve string version of this guitar available, the Rickenbacker 620/12. The Rickenbacker 620 comes in fireglo, mapleglo, jetglo, and midnight blue finishes from the factory. The 620 is less popular with big recording artists than its siblings the 330 and 360, however some guitarists have consistently used them including Christopher Owens of Girls, Caleb Harper of Spacey Jane, and Chris Urbanowicz of Editors. Mike Campbell of Tom Petty and the Heartbreakers acquired the first 620/12 12-string (made in December 1963, actually called a prototype 625/12) in 1977, and has used it on hits such as Listen to Her Heart and Here Comes My Girl.

== Features at a Glance ==
- Body Type Solid
- No. Frets 21
- Scale Length 62.9 cm (24 3/4")
- Neck Width at Nut 41.4 mm (1.63")
- Neck Width at 12th Fret 49.05 mm (1 .931")
- Crown Radius 25.4 cm (10")
- Weight 3.6 kg (8.0 lbs.)
- Overall Length 94.0 cm (37")
- Overall Width 33.7 cm (13 1/4")
- Overall Depth 31.8 mm (1 1/4")
- Tailpiece R
- Bridge 6 Saddle
- Output Type Mono and Stereo
- Machine Heads Schaller

== Notable players ==
- Mike Campbell of Tom Petty and the Heartbreakers
- Steven Van Zandt of Bruce Springsteen
- Susanna Hoffs of The Bangles
- Chris Urbanowicz of Editors
- Ringo Shiina of Tokyo Jihen, who also mentions her 620 in the song "Marunouchi Sadistic"
- Christopher Owens of Girls
- Matej Krajnc (Matt Kaye), Slovenian singer-songwriter, poet, novelist and translator
- Caleb Harper of Spacey Jane
- John Dyer Baizley of Baroness
