= Sestre (drag act) =

Slovenian drag act

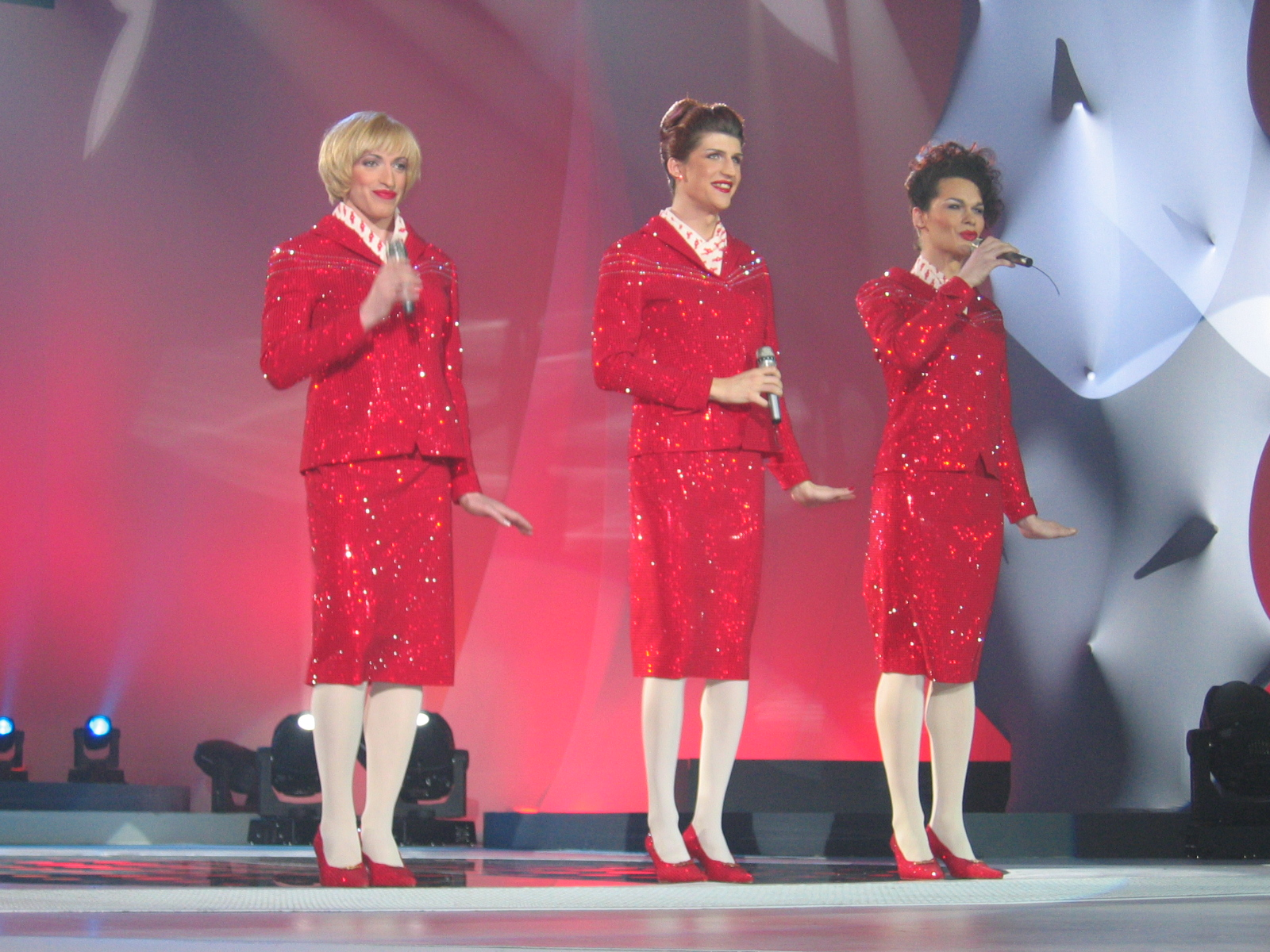
Sestre in 2002

Sestre are a Slovenian drag act that represented Slovenia at the Eurovision Song Contest 2002. They were among the bookmakers' favourites to win.

Tomaž (Marlenna), Damjan (Emperatrizz) and Srečko (Daphne) had been performing together since 2000 under the name Suspender Sisters with a classic drag queen show program. In February 2002, they competed in and won the Slovenian pre-selection with their song "Samo ljubezen" and so represented Slovenia at Eurovision 2002 in Tallinn. They placed 13th with 33 points.

In October 2002, they released their first album, Souvenir by Menart with the support of a co-operational team Dom Svobode: Magnifico, Barbara Pešut and Schatzi. The album was recorded in Slovene, but most of the songs are translated in English, Spanish, French and German.

== See also ==
- List of drag groups

Awards and achievements
| Preceded by Nuša Derenda with "Energy" | Slovenia in the Eurovision Song Contest; 2002 | Succeeded by Karmen Stavec with "Nanana" |
