= Julius Prüwer =

Austrian conductor

External audio
- Recordings with Julius Prüwer in the Online Archive of the Österreichische Mediathek
- Kaiser-Walzer by Johann Strauss, Berlin Philharmonic conducted by Julius Prüwer, 1928

Julius Prüwer (20 February 1874 – 8 July 1943) was an Austrian conductor, pianist and academic teacher.

== Life ==
Born in Vienna, Prüwer studied piano at the Vienna Conservatory from 1886 to 1891 with Arthur Friedheim and Moriz Rosenthal and music theory with Robert Fuchs, Franz Krenn, and (privately) with Johannes Brahms. As a conductor, he was trained by Hans Richter and worked first at the Bielitz Municipal Theater in 1892/93, at the Esseg Municipal Theater in 1893/94, and at the Cologne Opera in 1894/95. From 1895 to 1923, he was Kapellmeister at the Stadttheater Breslau, and from 1913 to 1923, he was also director of the opera there. Among other things, he conducted the German premiere of Mussorgsky's Boris Godunov there and in 1898 made a tour to St. Petersburg, where he arranged the Russian premiere of Wagner's Tristan und Isolde. In 1902, 1904, and 1906, he assisted Hans Richter at the Bayreuth Festival. In 1909, he published a music guide to Elektra by Richard Strauss.

In 1923/24 Prüwer was general music director at the Deutsches Nationaltheater und Staatskapelle Weimar, then full professor at the Berlin University of the Arts from 1924 to 1933. Here he was responsible for the training of kapellmeisters and directed the Hochschulorchester. In 1925, the Berlin Philharmonic chose him to conduct their popular concerts, and he conducted on more than 700 evenings until 1933. In 1933, he lost his posts because of his Jewish origins. In 1936, he took over the symphony orchestra of the Kulturbund Deutscher Juden in Frankfurt and taught at the Hollaender Jewish Private Music School in Berlin. In 1939, he emigrated to New York City, where he later taught at the College of Music and conducted the New York City Symphony Orchestra.

He was married with the opera singer Fanchette Verhunc.

Prüwer died in New York City at the age of 69.

== Recordings ==
From 1928 to 1930, Prüwer made numerous recordings for the Deutsche Grammophon Gesellschaft. He accompanied well-known singers in vocal recordings as well as the pianist Alexander Brailowsky in piano concertos by Frédéric Chopin and Franz Liszt, and recorded orchestral works by Franz Schubert (Unvollendete), Felix Mendelssohn Bartholdy, Johannes Brahms (Akademische Festouvertüre), Johann Strauss II and others.
