= Urška Arlič Gololičič =

Slovenian soprano opera singer (born 1980)

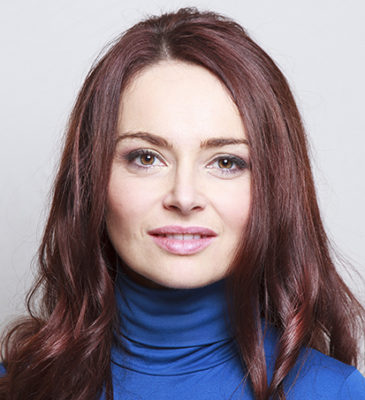
- Born: July 19, 1980 (age 45); Celje, SR Slovenia, SFR Yugoslavia
- Occupation: Opera singer (soprano)
- Website: urskaarlic.com

Urška Arlič Gololičič (born July 19, 1980, in Celje, Slovenia) is a Slovenian soprano opera singer.

== Education ==
Arlič Gololičič completed her bachelor studies with distinction at the Academy of Music in Ljubljana under the tutelage of Professor Irena Baar, and postgraduate studies under the tutelage of Professor Vlatka Oršanić. She is a winner of international competitions, amongst them the Ada Sari International Vocal Artistry Competition in Poland.

== Career ==
Arlič Gololičič performed "Dido's Lament" on the soundtrack of Agnieszka Holland's movie In Darkness, which was nominated for the Academy Awards. In 2015/16 she debuted as Gilda in Rigoletto at the Ljubljana Slovene National Theatre Opera and Ballet, where she is a soloist since 2013/14 season and where she performed such parts as Violetta in La traviata, Micaëla in Carmen, Mimì in La bohème, Adele in Die Fledermaus and Lauretta in Gianni Schicchi. In 2017 Arlič Gololičič debuted in the role of Marzelline in Fidelio at the Ljubljana Slovene National Theatre Opera and Ballet. Apart from engagements at opera houses, the artist was invited to festivals such as Polish Music Festival, where on the IXth edition she sang the title part in K. Szymanowski's opera Hagith, which was recorded and published as a CD.

== Opera repertoire ==
- L. v. Beethoven, Fidelio, Marzelline
- G. Bizet, Carmen, Micaëla
- A. Dvořák, Rusalka, Rusalka
- Anton Foerster, Gorenjski slavček, Minka
- C. W. Gluck, Orfeo ed Euridice, Amore
- E. Humperdinck, Hänsel und Gretel, Gretel
- Milko Lazar, Deseta hči, Deseta hči
- A. Lortzing, Undine, Undine
- W. A. Mozart, Le nozze di Figaro, Susanna
- W. A. Mozart, Die Zauberflöte, Pamina
- J. Offenbach, Orphée aux enfers, Euridice
- S. Osterc, Saloma, Saloma
- G. Puccini, Gianni Schicchi, Lauretta
- G. Puccini, La bohème, Mimì, Musetta
- H. Purcell, Dido and Aeneas, Belinda
- J. Strauss, Die Fledermaus, Adele
- K. Szymanowski, Hagith, Hagith
- G. Verdi, La traviata, Violetta
- G. Verdi, Rigoletto, Gilda
- H. Vidic, Izgubljeni nasmeh, Mother

== Oratorio repertoire ==
- G. Carissimi, Jephte
- E. Elgar, The Apostles
- H. Górecki, Symphonie No. 3
- G. F. Händel, Messiah
- G. Mahler, Symphonies No. 2, No. 4 and No. 8
- W. A. Mozart, Requiem
- G. B. Pergolesi, Stabat Mater
- G. Rossini, Stabat Mater
- A. Schnittke, Requiem
- H. Wolf, Christnacht
