= Nuša Derenda =

Slovenian singer

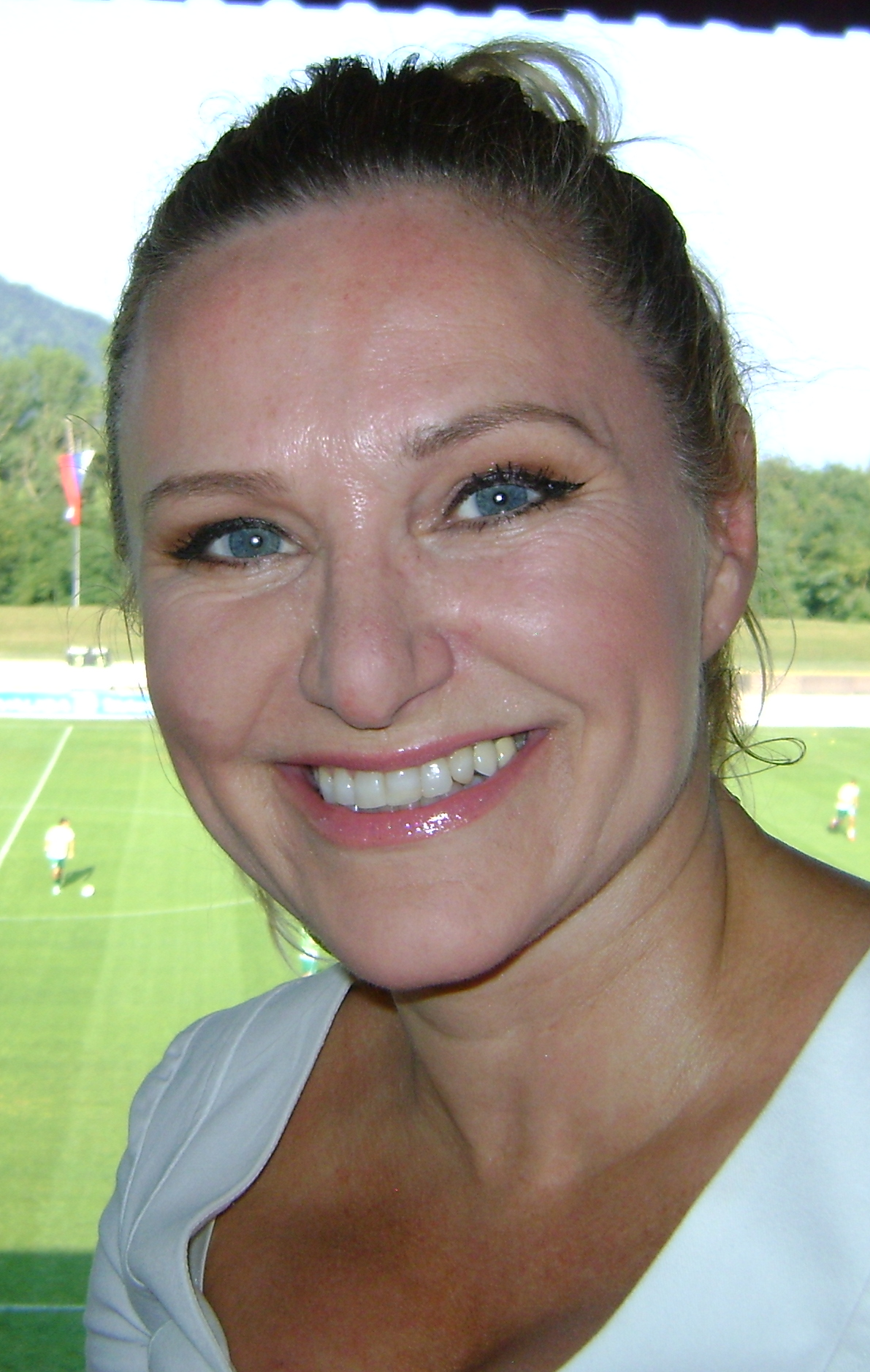
- Nuša Derenda in 2015

Background information
- Born: Anuška Žnideršič; March 30, 1969 (age 57); Brežice, SR Slovenia, SFR Yugoslavia
- Genre: Pop
- Occupation: Musician
- Instruments: Vocalist, accordion
- Years active: 1980s-
- Website: nusaderenda.com

Nuša Derenda (pronounced [ˈnuːʃa dɛˈɾenda], born Anuška Žnideršič on March 30, 1969 in Brežice, SR Slovenia, SFR Yugoslavia) is a Slovenian singer who represented Slovenia at the 2001 Eurovision Song Contest in Copenhagen, Denmark where she achieved 7th place.

== Biography ==
At the age of two and a half, Derenda's parents became aware of her singing talent. She always loved to sing and perform in front of an audience. Music was an integral part of her childhood. She sang in choruses, performed as a soloist, attended music school, and learned to play the accordion. Shortly before finishing primary school, Nuša joined a band of young musicians.

Although Derenda originally wanted to become a preschool teacher and work part-time in a nursery school for a year, she continued to sing with the band and traveled throughout Europe. In 1990, her band broke up and Nuša, along with her partner Frenk, established a new group. By that time they had already become professional and toured Yugoslavia, Germany, and Switzerland, and were invited to the US three times. Seven years of success and hard work followed, as their act performed up to 150 concerts in a single year. Since 1998, Derenda has mostly been working with a group called Happy Hour, with whom she records music in the studio and performs live.

== Awards ==
In 1995, Frenk and Nuša Derenda married and started thinking about permanently settling in Slovenia. She had dreamt about making an album for some time. In 1999, she fulfilled this ambition with the CD Vzemi me veter (Take Me, Wind): a song with the same title as the CD was written by her friend, Majda Arh. This song earned Nuša first place in the Slovene TV contest Orion (November 1998). At the Slovene Pop Contest 1999 (Slovenska popevka) Nuša received the award for best singer, and at the MMS festival (Melodies of the Sea and the Sun) the second prize from the audience with the song "Boginja" (The Goddess; written by Urša and Matjaž Vlašič, and Boštjan Grabnar). The same team of songwriter helped her win the Orion 2000 contest with the song "Čez dvajset let" (In Twenty Years). This group of songwriters also accompanied her to the festival MMS 2000 (Melodies of the Sea and Sun). Nuša Derenda sang the song "Ne kliči me" (Don't Call Me) and won the audience prize for the second time.

In November 2000, the first HIT Festival was held, and Nuša Derenda won with the song "Ni mi žal" (I'm Not Sorry). In December the same year she issued a CD with the same title.

=== Eurovision 2001 ===
Winning the EMA 2001 attracted greater media attention and popularity. She participated in the Eurovision Song Contest 2001 in Copenhagen with the song "Energy" (Ne, ni res), where she finished seventh, achieving the best result for Slovenia (as of 2026).

Points	Country
12	—
10	Bosnia and Herzegovina
8	Croatia
7	Sweden
6	Norway, Iceland, Poland
5	Estonia
4	Netherlands, Russia, Lithuania, Germany
3	—
2	Spain, Ireland
1	Israel, France

== More Awards ==
In 2001, thanks to her Eurovision performance, she attended the International Golden Stag Festival in Braşov, Romania. There, she won a special prize from the Ministry of Culture for the best interpretation of a Romanian-language song. Nuša also visited Germany for the Eurosong Fan Club Party in Cologne, where she also held a solo concert. At the end of October 2001, she was invited to Croatia to Zadarfest. There she was awarded second place by the professional jury, and the prize for the best lyrics. That same year 2001 also brought her Victor of Popularity in the music category, which is presented every year by the magazine Stop: the winner is selected by its readers. Also that year, she received the Zlati petelin (Golden Rooster) award for the song "Ni mi žal" (I'm Not Sorry).

Nuša became one of the candidates for Slovene Woman of the Year 2001. 2002 was marked by victory at Slovenska popevka (Slovene Pop Contest) with the song "Pesek v oči" (Deception). At the beginning of December 2002, she released her third CD with the title Na štiri oči (In Private).

In 2003, Nuša again attended the HIT Festival – the third in succession – and won with the song "V ogenj zdaj obleci me" (Dress Me With Fire). The song won the prize from professional jury for the best music and lyrics.

Her Greatest Hits Collection 1998–2003 (Največji uspehi 1998/2003) was released in April 2004. The CD contains most of the popular songs from the beginning of her career to her latest tracks to date of release.

On September 5 that year, she hosted Slovenska popevka 2004 (Slovene Song 2004) at Križanke in Ljubljana and successfully passed the challenge of TV host.

== 2004 Megahit-International Mediterranean Song Contest ==
From September 6 to 12, 2004, she participated in the 3rd Megahit-International Mediterranean Song Contest at the Fethiye tourist centre in southern Turkey. The Mediterranean Song Contest is an international music festival, founded by the END PRODUCTION company, led by Serhat Hacipasalioglu. The festival promotes popular music of Mediterranean countries. Its motto is "Music Unites Peace and Friendship". With 91 points, Nuša won a perfect third place with the song "Devil" at the award ceremony in 2002.

== EMA (Slovenia) ==
- 1998: Usliši me, nebo (Matija Oražem - Damjana Hussu Kenda - Matija Oražem)
- 1999: Nekaj lepega je v meni (Matija Oražem - Damjana Hussu Kenda - Matija Oražem) - 9th (10 points)
- 2001: Ne, ni res (Matjaž Vlašič - Urša Vlašič - Matjaž Vlašič, Boštjan Grabnar) - 1st (34 points)
- 2003: Prvič in zadnjič (Matjaž Vlašič - Urša Vlašič - Matjaž Vlašič, Boštjan Grabnar) – 2nd (13637 televotes)
- 2005: Noe, Noe (Matjaž Vlašič - Urša Vlašič - Matjaž Vlašič, Boštjan Grabnar) - 4th (19090 televotes)
- 2010: Sanjajva (Neisha - Neisha - Neisha, Dejan Radičević) – 9th (2 points)
- 2016: Tip Top (Andraž Gliha, Žiga Pirnat - Žiga Pirnat - Žiga Pirnat)

== Slovenian song festival ==
- 1999: Vzemi me veter – winner in the opinion of the jury
- 2000: Čez dvajset let
- 2002: Pesek v oči – 1st
- 2012: Naj nama sodi le nebo – 1st (with Marko Vozelj)
- 2014: Noč čudežna – 4th
- 2016: Grafit - 2nd

== Discography ==
- 1999 Vzemi me veter (Take me, wind)
- 2000 Ni mi žal (I'm not sorry) (HER BEST-SELLING ALBUM)
- 2001 Festivali (Festivals)
- 2002 Na štiri oči (On four eyes)
- 2004 Največje uspešnice (1998 - 2004) (Greatest hits (1998–2004))
- 2005 Nuša za otroke (Nuša for children)
- 2008 Prestiž (Prestige)
- 2013 Za stare čase (For old times)

== Singles ==
- 1998: Usliši me nebo
- 1999: Nekaj lepega je v meni, Vzemi me veter
- 2000: Ne kliči me, Čez dvajset let
- 2001: Ne, ni res, Energy, Ako moj je grijeh
- 2002: Pesek v oči
- 2003: Prvič in zadnjič
- 2004: Devil, V dobrem in v zlu
- 2005: Noe, Noe
- 2008: Danes vračam se, Za Slovenijo živim
- 2010: Sanjajva, Kada zvijezda padne z neba, Edina
- 2011: Duša moje duše, Kakor ptica, kakor pesem, Nepremagljivi, Zavrtel si me
- 2012: Ja u sebe vjerujem, Za stare čase, Naj nama sodi le nebo, Za nobeno ceno, Ona ve, Svako ima nekog (koga više nema)
- 2014: Blues in vino, Noč čudežna
- 2015: Mi smo s teboj, Dobro se imej
- 2016: Grafit, Tip Top, Beat in ti

Awards and achievements
Preceded by Darja Švajger with "For A Thousand Years"	Slovenia in the Eurovision Song Contest; 2001	Succeeded by Sestre with "Samo ljubezen"
