= Moni Kovačič =

American singer

- Born: Monique De Haviland; June 21, 1960 (age 66); Wiesbaden, West Germany
- Origin: Connecticut, United States
- Occupations: pop singer, entrepreneur

Moni Kovačič (born Monique De Haviland) is a US-based Slovenian former pop singer, especially well known in SFR Yugoslavia during the late 1970s and early 1980s due to her hit single "Brez ljubezni mi živeti ni" (No use living without love), released in 1978 by the label ZKP RTVLj. Album releases were Zagonetka (Puzzle) and Može i jače (Can do it stronger).

Born in 1960 to an American father Bill De Haviland and a Slovenian mother Brigita Kovačič, Monique grew up in Connecticut and took up performing from an early age.
