= Matt Kaye =

Slovenian author and musician

Matt Kaye was born in 1975 in Maribor, Slovenia (EU). He holds a master's degree in comparative literature from the Faculty of Arts, Ljubljana, Slovenia. He published his first book in 1988 and started combining poetry and music into a singer-songwriter routine in 1992. Between 1998 and 2017 he recorded over 100 albums for various labels in Slovenia and Croatia, participated in nearly every important literary-music festival in Slovenia, worked for Slovenian national radio and other media as a musical connoisseur, and wrote/translated around 70 books as a member of Slovenia's National Writers' Association, PEN Association and National Literary Translators Association. He has written several monographs, including a book on the works of Johnny Cash, Elvis Presley, The Beatles and Slovenian singers Oto Pestner and Lado Leskovar. He has translated poems and wrote professional articles on Alexander Pope, Bob Dylan, Leonard Cohen, Tom Waits, Bruce Springsteen, Kris Kristofferson and many others. He writes musical/literary reviews and articles for many newspapers and reviews in Slovenia, including Delo (Književni listi), Odzven, Nova muska, Glasna, and Literatura. He is known to play Fender Telecaster and Stratocaster guitars, Rickenbacker 620 Maple Glo guitar, a Martin USA 12-string acoustic and several other Fender and Gibson electric and acoustic guitars.

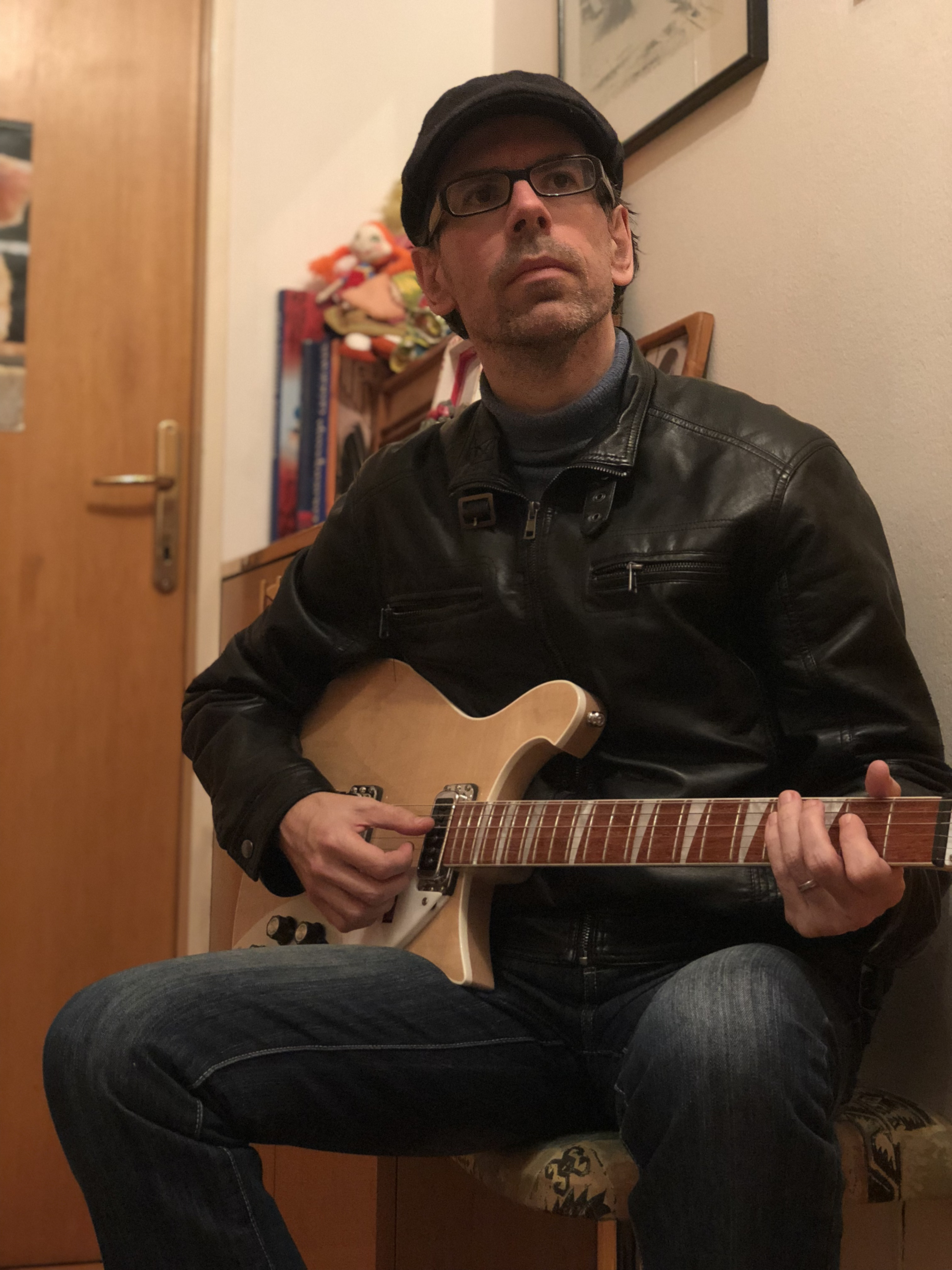
Matt Kaye (Matej Krajnc), 2018

== English discography ==
SINGLES:

The Harm, single, Feb. 2018

But/Toy Balloons, single, Mar. 2018

Cerebral Palsy Blues/Snowball Jesus Westenra, single, May 18

I Came From Memphis, Jun. 2018

Dreams (The Cranberries cover), Aug. 2018

EPs:

Widgets, Or Else, Feb. 18

Four Square Meters, Jul. 18

Rock'n'Roll, Aug. 18

The Spring Connection Suite, Mar. 20

ALBUMS:

Unarranged, Kvakas/Slušaj najglasnije!, Jun. 2018

Gettin' Things Done, Slušaj najglasnije!, Jul. 2018

The Guardian, Kvakas/Akord Records/Kulturni center Maribor, 2019

== Blind Boy Spectacles ==
Blind Boy Spectacles is a stage name of Matej Krajnc (Matt Kaye) for his gospel and blues work. He records under that name for the indie label Slušaj najglasnije!.

Kaye came up with the name of Blind Boy Spectacles out of respect for old blues and gospel singers. He first used the name in 2006 for the recording of the Country Gospel album because of the possible confusion with his other work as a singer-songwriter, writer, critic and translator. After joining the Slušaj najglasnije! label in 2010, he decided to continue his more gospel and blues oriented work in English under that name. His gospel opus is among the most notable works in the field of the modern European gospel and blues history, especially in the ex-Yugoslav countries, based on the reviews of a renowned Croatian music portal Terapija.net.

== Discography ==
=== Albums and EPs ===
- Country Gospel (album) (2006)
- Blues Session (EP) (2014)
- Gospel Session (album) (2015)
- Gospel Archives (EP) (2016)
- B. B. S. (album) (2016)
- Milky White Way (EP) (2017)
- Pickin' The Gospel (album) (2018)

=== Singles ===
- Blind Barnabus, 2018
