= Peter Andrej =

Slovenian musician

Peter Andrej (born 13 August 1959 in Maribor) is a Slovenian poet, musician, guitar player, studio producer, and the producer of the biggest Slovenian festival of singer-songwriters, KantFest.

Beside his own songs, Andrej has put to music poems by: Paul Éluard, Federico García Lorca, Bertolt Brecht, Oton Župančič, E. Vouk, B. A. Novak, B. Namestnik, and Aleš Šteger. He has also been an invited guest in many performance festivals – Festival Lent, Cankar Hall, the Borštnik meeting, KUD France Prešeren, and international stages in Trieste, Macedonia, etc.

In 2008, he was working with "varieté Rože za F" (Flowers for F), which had many successful performances and was also seen and heard in that year's Festival Lent. After rediscovering his original artistic roots, Andrej was also preparing a rock album, Libero, in cooperation with Drago Mlinarec, Ciril Sem on percussion instruments, Matjaž Krivec on contra bass, Dejan Berden on piano and harmonica, and Peter Jan on solo guitar.

Andrej is also a composer of music and creator of shows for children. The puppet show, "Jezernik, povodni mož iz Črnega jezera" (Lakey, the aqua man from the Black Lake) is the latest of his creations for children. It is presented in partnership with the storyteller, Jasna Branka Staman. Another album for children "Kaj ima sonce najraje" (What Sun loves the most) contains songs by Niko Grafenauer, Boris A. Novak, and folk songs, accompanied by his music.
