= Samo ljubezen =

2002 song by Sestre

Single by Sestre
- Language: Slovene
- Released: 2002
- Composer: Robert Pešut
- Lyricist: Barbara Pešut

Eurovision Song Contest 2002 entry
- Country: Slovenia
- Artists: Tomaž Mihelič; Damjan Levec; Srečko Blas
- As: Sestre
- Language: Slovene
- Composer: Robert Pešut
- Lyricist: Barbara Pešut

Finals performance
- Final result: 13th
- Final points: 33

Entry chronology
- ◄ "Energy" (2001)
- "Nanana" (2003) ►

"Samo ljubezen" ("Only love") is a song with lyrics written by Barbara Pešut and music by Robert Pešut. It represented Slovenia in the Eurovision Song Contest 2002. It was performed by Sestre, a trio of transvestite men dressed as airflight attendants, and marked the first time an entire ensemble had performed at Eurovision in drag, sparking anti-gay protests in Slovenia as well as debate in the Slovenian Parliament and the European Parliament about the song and the public reaction. It came equal thirteenth on 33 points with Bosnia and Herzegovina and Belgium.

The trio Sestre (meaning "Sisters"), consisting of Miss Marlena (real name Tomaž Mihelič), Daphne (Srečko Blas) and Emperatrizz (Damjan Levec), won the Slovenian national final, EMA 2002, defeating the favourite Karmen Stavec after positive reviews from the expert jury. Controversy ensued, as a technical issue with the public televoting portion of the result failed when the voting period ran overtime, leading to the nullification of the televote which Stavec won. This led to a portion of the Slovenian public, anti-gay activists, to take to the streets of the capital Ljubljana, protesting the selection of the song, which they saw as a slight to Slovenia. Furthermore, speeches calling for the group to be disendorsed reached the Slovenian Parliament, and beyond to the European Parliament, leading to some European politicians claiming that Slovenia should not be admitted into the European Union on account of the social attitudes to homosexuality. Emperatrizz had himself won the second runner-up award at the European Miss Transvestite 1997 pageant.

The group appeared at Eurovision dressed as flight attendants, wearing white shirts, white gloves, white stockings, high heels, red cap, lipstick, glittery red suits and skirts, and all sporting short brown hair. The song did not involve dancing, and they were backed by two male and one female singer dressed as airline pilots, in a full white suit, trousers and cap. Their visual appearance at the national contest was co-designed by Uroš Belantic and Meta Podkrajšek from the Diggiloo Thrush.

== Citations ==
- Kennedy O'Connor, John (2005). The Eurovision Song Contest: The Official History.
