= Fanchette Verhunc =

Sloven operatic soprano and voice teacher

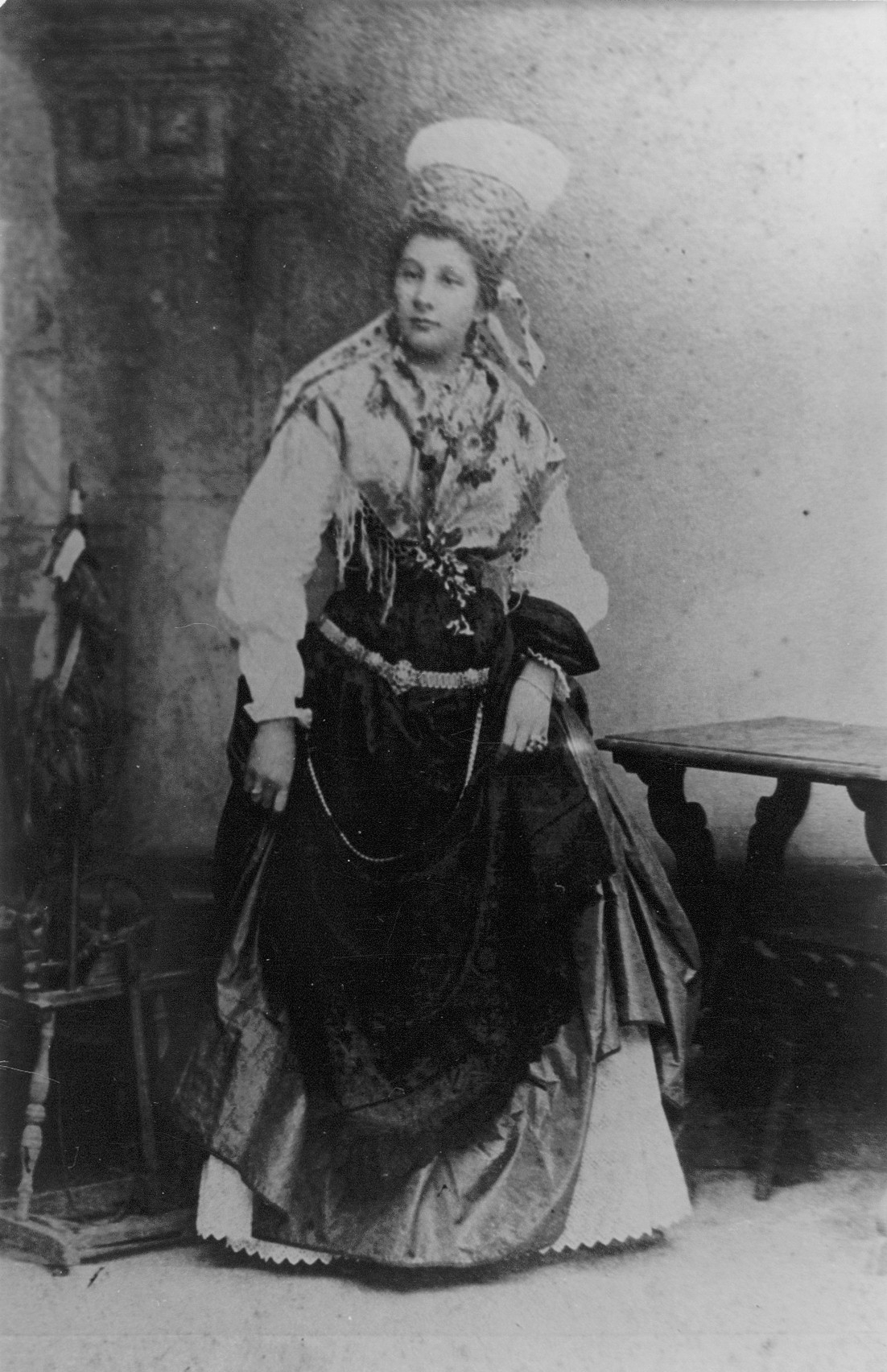
Fanchette Verhunc

Fanchette Verhunc, also Fanchette Verhunck and Fandetta Verhunc, real name Franja Vrhunc, married name Fanchette Holzapfel (8 August 1874 – 11 November 1944) was a Slovenian operatic soprano and vocal coach.

== Life ==
Born in Laibach, Verhunc was fond of music from childhood. Growing up, she took lessons from Professor Josef Gänsbacher and Felice Mancio and took to the stage. After graduating from the Vienna Conservatory, she was first engaged for a short time at the Staatsoper Unter den Linden, then came to Posen to work through her repertoire from there, and from here, after a year's work, went to the Breslau City Theater.She was also invited to participate in the Bayreuth Festival in 1901, where she was assigned "Freia," "Ortlinde," and the "First Squire" in Parsifal.

In 1901 she made guest appearances at the Dresden Court Opera, in 1903 at the Vienna Court Opera and in 1905 at the Munich Court Opera.

In 1907, she sang the title role of "Salome" in the eponymous opera by Richard Strauss in the Vienna premiere of this opera at the Vienna Volkstheater. She also appeared as a guest in Amsterdam and Budapest. In Breslau she gave a charity concert in 1916 and then took stage leave in 1917, after which she worked as a singing teacher in Breslau, Berlin and Frankfurt.

In 1938 she lived in Frankfurt, but returned in 1944 to her Slovenian homeland.

She was married to the tenor Adalbert Holzapfel and after the divorce the life partner of the conductor Julius Prüwer.

Verhunc died in Golnik, Carniola, at the age of 70.
