= Vili Resnik =

Slovenian singer

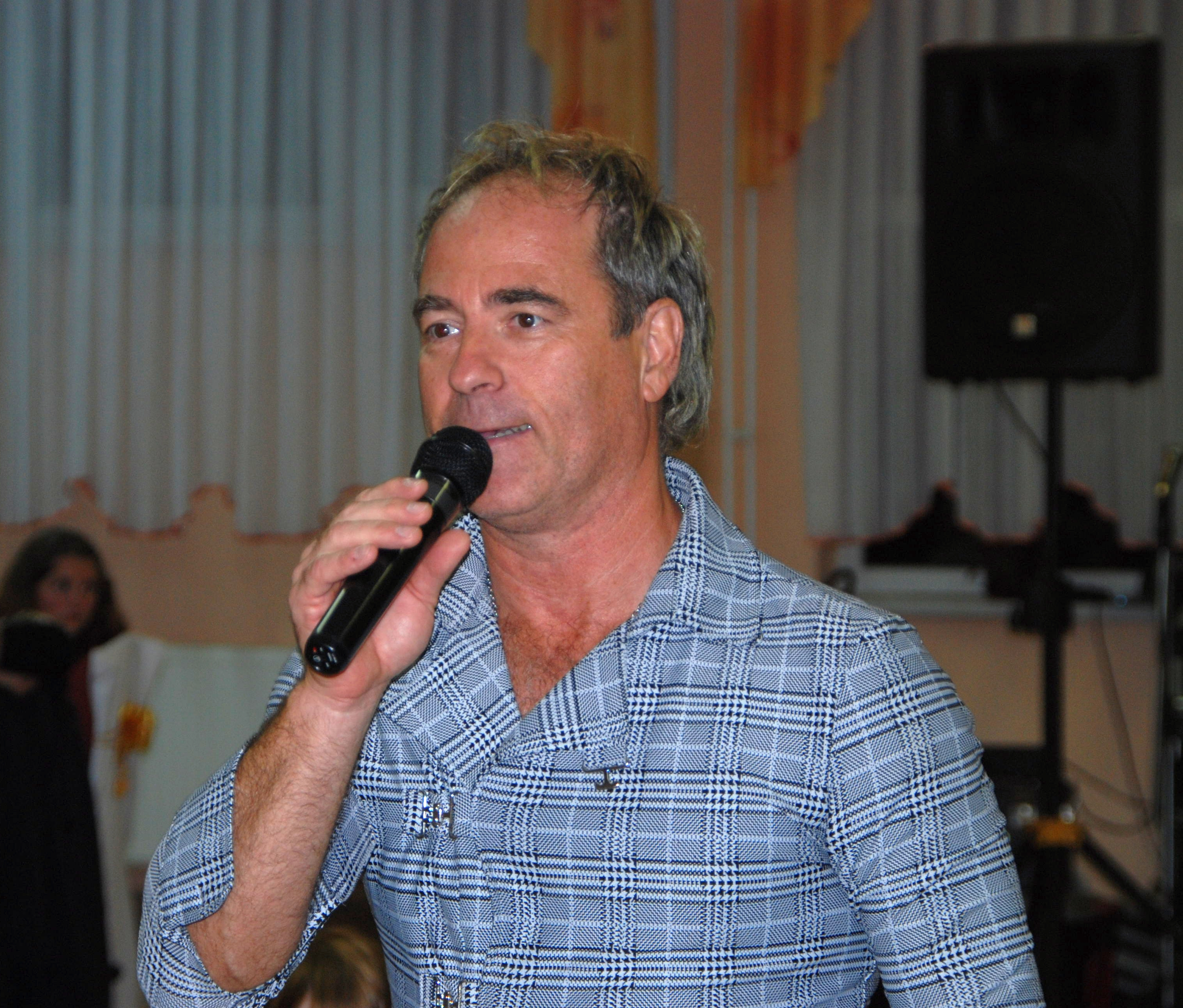
Vili Resnik in 2013

Vili Resnik (born November 27, 1963) is a Slovenian rock singer and guitarist.

== Biography ==
Since his youth he was active in various sorts of bands as a guitarist and singer. He also learned to play violin at school. From 1990 to 1995 he was the frontman of the Slovenian rock band Pop Design, with whom he released several albums. He was selected to represent his country at the Eurovision Song Contest 1998 in Birmingham with his ballad "Naj bogovi slišijo". At Eurovision, Resnik ended up in 18th place in the field of 25.

Resnik also made an appearance in the Slovenian TV series Lepo je biti sosed.

== Albums ==
- Zdaj Živim (1996)
- Rad Bi Bil S Teboj (1997)
- Zadnji Žigolo (1998)
- Odiseja (2000)
- Reka Želja (2004)
- Svet Je Lep (2014)
