= Darja Švajger =

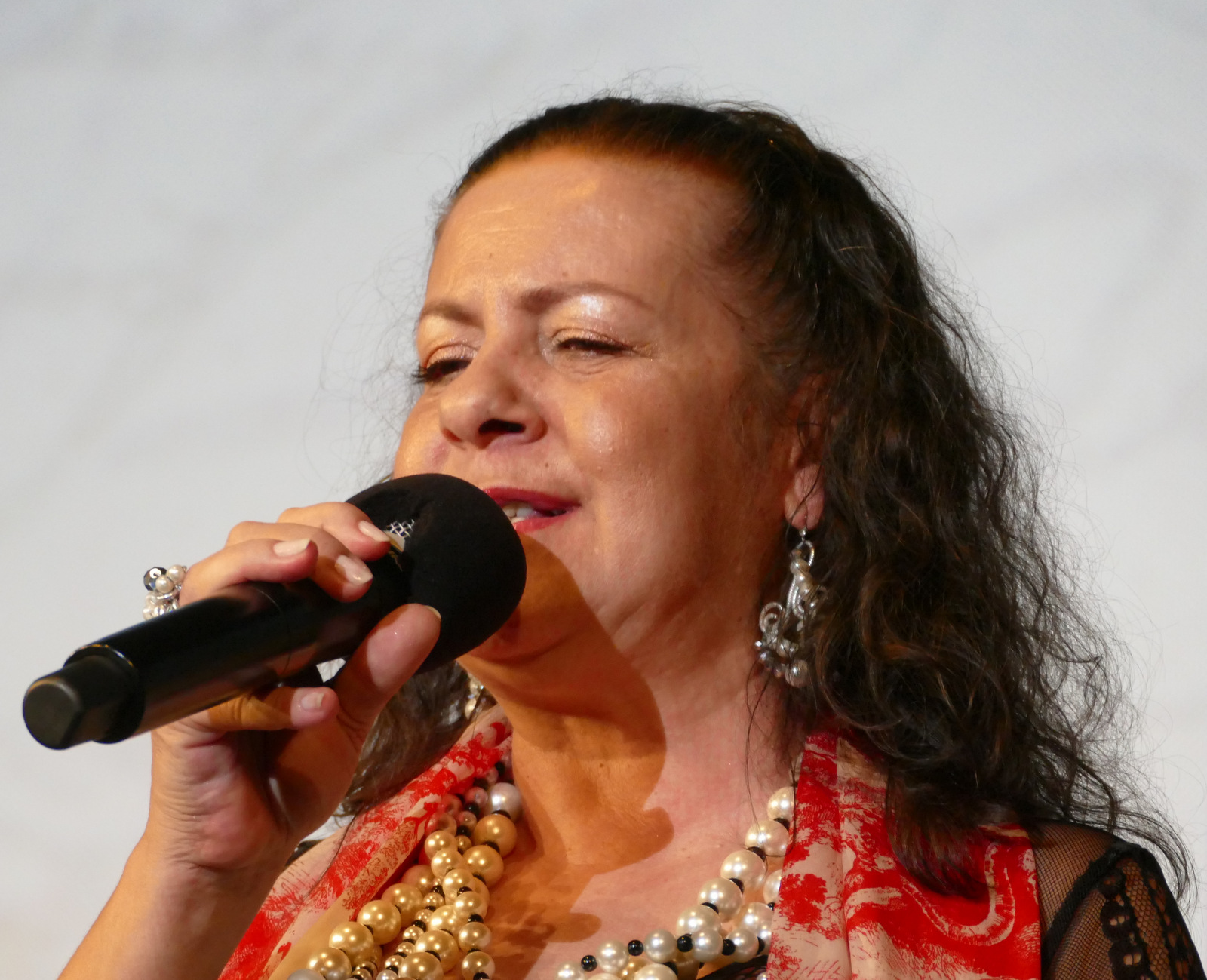
- Švajger in 2023

Background information
- Born: 16 June 1965 (age 61); Maribor, SR Slovenia, SFR Yugoslavia
- Origin: SFR Yugoslavia, now Slovenia
- Occupation: Singer
- Years active: 1993–present

Darja Švajger (born 16 June 1965 in Maribor, SR Slovenia, SFR Yugoslavia) is one of Slovenia's most popular singers, best known for having represented her country in the Eurovision Song Contest on two occasions.

== Early life ==
Music entered Švajger's life when she was still a child. After finishing secondary school, she entered the College of Music and attended art classes in Graz, Austria, where she studied classical solo singing and jazz. In 1997, she graduated magna cum laude. Already during her studies she had started performing as a solo vocalist with various bands and symphony orchestras. Since 1992 she has been engaged in several projects of the Slovene National Theatre in Maribor. In 1993, the international jury of the Melodies of the Sea and the Sun pop music festival, held in Koper, awarded her first prize in the Slovenian section of the international category. Her first album, In the Arms of the Night, soon followed.

== Eurovision 1995 ==
The year 1995 was of great importance to Švajger. She represented represented Slovenia in the Eurovision Song Contest in Dublin, performing the song "Prisluhni mi" (Listen to Me) by Primoc Peterca and Saso Fajon. The ballad achieved seventh place: Slovenia's best ever result to the contest. Švajger won the 1995 and 1996 Pop Singer of the Year awards in Slovenia. In the following years, she became very active and her second album, Moments, was released in 1998.

== Eurovision 1999 ==
In 1999, Švajger again won the Slovene national selection for Eurovision and therefore was selected to represent the country in the Eurovision Song Contest held in Jerusalem. Peterca and Fajon again wrote a ballad for her, "For A Thousand Years". The composer stated that he had been inspired by the city of New York during his four-month stay there. Slovene broadcaster RTVSLO had high hopes and indeed the song was in first place at the beginning of the voting; it even got a highest score of 12 points from Ireland and Croatia. The song finally scored a total of 50 points and was ranked 11th among the 23 entries.

== Albums ==
- 1994: V objemu noči
- 1995: Prisluhni mi
- 1998: Trenutki
- 1999: Še tisoč let
- 2001: Plameni
- 2005: Najlepše uspešnice
- 2008: Moji obrazi
- 2013: Moji obrazi

== Official music videos ==
- 1995: Prisluhni mi
- 1999: Še tisoč let / For a Thousand Years
- 2014: Sončen dan
- 2015: En svet

== See also ==
- Slovenia in the Eurovision Song Contest

Preceded by 1X Band with "Tih deževen dan"	Slovenia in the Eurovision Song Contest; 1995	Succeeded by Regina with "Dan najlepših sanj"
Preceded by Vili Resnik with "Naj bogovi slišijo"	Slovenia in the Eurovision Song Contest; 1999	Succeeded by Nuša Derenda with "Energy"
