= Aleksander Kogoj =

Slovenian film director (born 1965)

Aleksander Kogoj is a Slovenian film director, born 1965 in Ljubljana. His interest in film making began at an early age. As a teenager he wrote a good deal, and his passions were special effects. His skills as a musician meant he could combine sound and visuals, which led to his first experimental film, 'Keketz'.

His first television show was called 'Music Boutique' (Glasbeni butik). When he was a student he also worked as a script writer for commercials. Since 1993 he has made numerous commercials and music videos. In 2000 he received the TV Slovenia Award for Best Creation. He specializes in comedy and storytelling, and is also a master at special effects and compositing.
