= Karmen Stavec =

Slovene musician and pop singer (born 1973)

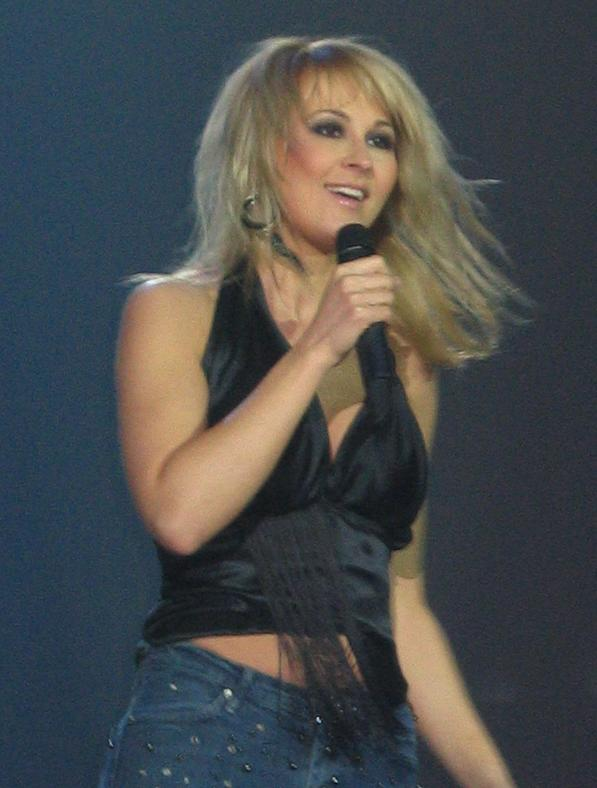
- Karmen Stavec

Background information
- Born: 21 December 1973 (age 52); West Berlin, West Germany
- Genres: pop
- Occupation: singer

Karmen Stavec (born 21 December 1973) is a Slovene musician and pop singer.

== Early years ==
Karmen was born in West Berlin, at that time part of West Germany, to Slovene parents. After graduation she came to Domžale, Slovenia, where she joined the dance duo "4 Fun". She also began to study Germanic studies at the Philosophical Faculty at the University of Ljubljana. In 1998 she started her own solo career.

== Music career ==
She has participated four times in Slovene national selection, called "EMA" for the Eurovision song contest in 1998 (with Patrik Greblo), EMA 2001, EMA 2002 and EMA 2003. In 2002, at the EMA, she took second place behind the trio Sestre ("The Sisters"), although she received the highest number of points from televoting. Her song, "Še in še" won the National Finals Song Contest. In 2003 she won, and she represented Slovenia at the Eurovision Song Contest 2003, where she finished in 23rd place with the song "Nanana", sung in English. The Slovene version of the song is called Lep poletni dan (meaning A Nice Summer Day).

In 2008, Karmen announced a return to the music scene with another entry in EMA 2009 with the song "A si želiš". She finished third in the semi-finals and tenth in the final.

== Discography ==
- Ostani Tu (2001)
- Karmen (2003)

Awards and achievements
Preceded by Sestre with "Samo ljubezen"	Slovenia in the Eurovision Song Contest; 2003	Succeeded by Platin with "Stay Forever"
