= Magnifico (musician) =

Slovenian actor-singer

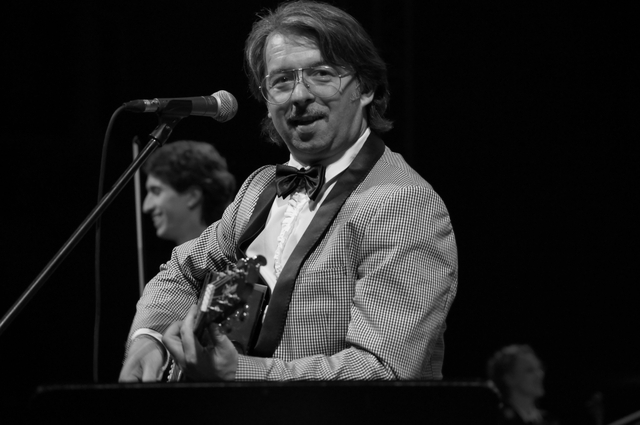
- Magnifico performing live on Druga Godba Festival in Ljubljana, Slovenia, 31 May 2014
- Born: Robert Pešut; 1 December 1965 (age 59); Ljubljana, SR Slovenia, SFR Yugoslavia
- Citizenship: Slovenia
- Occupation: vocalist
- Years active: 1992–present
- Website: Official website

Robert Pešut (born 1 December 1965), known as Magnifico, is a Slovenian singer of Slovene and Serbian descent.

== Biography ==
His mother originates from White Carniola, which is a small traditional region in southeastern Slovenia. His father is of Serbian descent. His grandfather was a Serbian soldier who fought on the Salonika front in the First World War, to whom he also dedicated a song called "Pukni zoro" from his album Montevideo, Bog te video in 2013.

His musical path began with musical group U'redu, with whom he recorded his first album, Let's Dance (1992). After that, he embarked on a solo career, recording six albums in twelve years.

== Discography ==
Selected discography includes:

- Let's Dance (with U'redu), 1992
- Od srca do srca, 1993
- Kdo je čefur, 1996
- Stereotip (soundtrack), 1997
- Sexy Boy, 1999
- Komplet (hit songs), 2001
- Export-Import, 2003
- Grande Finale, 2007 Look more
- Srečno, 2008
- Magnification, 2010 Look more
- Montevideo, Bog te video, 2013
- Charlatan de Balkan, 2016
