= Slovenia in the Eurovision Song Contest 2018 =

- Eurovision Song Contest 2018
- Participating broadcaster: Radiotelevizija Slovenija (RTVSLO)
- Country: Slovenia
- Selection process: Evrovizijska Melodija 2018
- Selection date: 24 February 2018

Competing entry
- Song: "Hvala, ne!"
- Artist: Lea Sirk
- Songwriters: Lea Sirk; Tomy DeClerque

Placement
- Semi-final result: Qualified (8th, 132 points)
- Final result: 22nd, 64 points

Participation chronology

Slovenia was represented at the Eurovision Song Contest 2018 with the song "Hvala, ne!", written by Lea Sirk and Tomy DeClerque, and performed by Lea Sirk herself. The Slovene participating broadcaster, Radiotelevizija Slovenija (RTVSLO), organised the national selection Evrovizijska Melodija 2018 in order to select its entry for the contest. 16 entries competed in the national final which consisted of two shows: a semi-final and a final. Entries were selected to advance from the semi-final based on a public televote and a jury panel. Eight entries qualified to compete in the final where "Hvala, ne!" performed by Lea Sirk was selected as the winner following the combination of votes from six thematical juries and a public televote.

Slovenia was drawn to compete in the second semi-final of the Eurovision Song Contest which took place on 10 May 2018. Performing during the show in position 17, "Hvala, ne!" was announced among the top 10 entries of the second semi-final and therefore qualified to compete in the final on 12 May. It was later revealed that Slovenia placed eighth out of the 18 participating countries in the semi-final with 132 points. In the final, Slovenia performed in position 3 and placed twenty-second out of the 26 participating countries with 64 points.

== Background ==
Prior to the 2018 contest, Radiotelevizija Slovenija (RTVSLO) had participated in the Eurovision Song Contest representing Slovenia twenty-three times since its first entry in 1993. Its highest placing in the contest, to this point, has been seventh place, achieved on two occasions: in 1995 with the song "Prisluhni mi" performed by Darja Švajger and in 2001 with the song "Energy" performed by Nuša Derenda. The country's only other top ten result was achieved in 1997 when Tanja Ribič performing "Zbudi se" placed tenth. Since the introduction of semi-finals to the format of the contest in 2004, Slovenia had thus far only managed to qualify to the final on four occasions. In 2017, "On My Way" performed by Omar Naber failed to qualify to the final.

As part of its duties as participating broadcaster, RTVSLO organises the selection of its entry in the Eurovision Song Contest and broadcasts the event in the country. The broadcaster confirmed its participation in the 2018 contest on 15 September 2017. RTVSLO has traditionally selected its entry through a national final entitled Evrovizijska Melodija (EMA), which has been produced with variable formats. To this point, the broadcaster has only foregone the use of this national final in 2013 when the entry was internally selected. For 2018, the broadcaster opted to organise Evrovizijska Melodija 2018 (EMA 2018) to select its entry.

== Before Eurovision ==
=== EMA 2018 ===
EMA 2018 was the 22nd edition of the Slovenian national final format Evrovizijska Melodija (EMA). The competition was used by RTV Slovenija to select Slovenia's entry for the Eurovision Song Contest 2018, and consisted of two shows on 17 and 24 February 2018. Both shows of the competition took place at the RTV Slovenija Studio 1 in Ljubljana and were broadcast on TV SLO 1, Radio Val 202, Radio Koper, Radio Maribor and online via the broadcaster's RTV 4D platform.

==== Format ====
The format of the competition consisted of two televised shows: a semi-final held on 17 February 2018 and a final held on 24 February 2018. Sixteen songs competed in the semi-final where a public televote first selected the top four entries to proceed to the final. An expert jury then selected an additional four finalists out of the fourteen remaining songs. Eight songs competed in the final where the winner was selected following the 50/50 combination of points from six thematical juries and a public televote. Each jury assigned points as follows: 1–8, 10 and 12, while the televote assigned points that had a weighting equal to the votes of six jury groups. The song that received the highest overall score when the votes were combined was determined the winner.

==== Competing entries ====
Artists and composers were able to submit their entries to the broadcaster between 15 September 2017 and 15 November 2017. 108 entries were received by the broadcaster during the submission period. An expert committee consisting of Maja Keuc, Eva Hren (musician and guitar teacher), Jernej Vene (music editor for Radio Val 202) and Tadej Košir (musician, guitarist and songwriter) selected sixteen artists and songs for the competition from the received submissions. The competing artists were announced on 8 December 2017. Among the competing artists were former Slovenian Eurovision contestants Tanja Ribič who represented Slovenia in 1997 and ManuElla who represented Slovenia in 2016.

Artist	Song	Songwriter(s)
Anabel	"Pozitiva"	Nino Ošlak, Marko Golubović
BQL	"Ptica"	Maraaya, Rok Lunaček, Tina Piš
BQL	"Promise"	Maraaya, Rok Lunaček, Tina Piš, Charlie Mason, Anej Piletič
Gregor Ravnik	"Zdaj je čas"	Marko Hrvatin, Gregor Ravnik, Steffy
Ina Shai	"V nebo"	Martina Šraj, Hans Kristjan Aljas
Ina Shai	"Glow"	Martina Šraj, Hans Kristjan Aljas
Indigo	"Vesna"	Anja Pavlin, Anže Čuček, Maj Valerij
King Foo	"Žive sanje"	Rok Golob
Lara Kadis	"Zdaj sem tu"	Lara Kadis
Lea Sirk	"Hvala, ne!"	Lea Sirk, Tomy DeClerque
ManuElla	"Glas"	Mike Eriksson, Lauren Evans, Leon Oblak
Marina Martensson	"Blizu"	Miha Koren, Vanja Papež
Mila	"Svoboda"	Denis Horvat, Matevž Šalehar
Nika Zorjan	"Uspavanka"	Maraaya, Nika Zorjan, Jimmy Jansson, Samuel Waermö, Art Hunter
Nuška Drašček	"Ne zapusti me zdaj"	Aleš Klinar, Anja Rupel
Orter	"Kraljica"	Klemen Orter, Martin Bezjak
Proper	"Ukraden cvet"	Nejc Podobnik
Tanja Ribič	"Ljudje"	Raay, Rok Lunaček

==== Semi-final ====
The semi-final of EMA 2018 took place on 17 February 2018, hosted by Vid Valič. The sixteen competing entries first faced a public televote where the top four proceeded to the final; an additional four qualifiers were then selected out of the remaining six entries by a seven-member jury panel. The jury consisted of Maja Keuc (2011 Slovenian Eurovision entrant), Hannah Mancini (2013 Slovenian Eurovision entrant), Raiven (singer, harpist and songwriter), Robi Pikl (guitarist, singer and songwriter), Žiga Klančar (music editor for Radio Val 202), Emi Den Baruca (video content designer) and Mario Galunič (responsible editor for the entertainment programme of RTV Slovenija).

Public vote qualifier Jury qualifier

Semi-final – 17 February 2018
R/O	Artist	Song	Jury	Televote		Result
R/O	Artist	Song	Jury	Votes	Rank	Result
1	Anabel	"Pozitiva"	13	489	7	—N/a
2	Tanja Ribič	"Ljudje"	14	313	11	—N/a
3	King Foo	"Žive sanje"	8	151	14	—N/a
4	Ina Shai	"V nebo"	6	206	13	Advanced
5	Indigo	"Vesna"	7	452	8	Advanced
6	ManuElla	"Glas"	12	268	12	—N/a
7	Mila	"Svoboda"	15	76	16	—N/a
8	Orter	"Kraljica"	16	128	15	—N/a
9	Lara Kadis	"Zdaj sem tu"	2	1,373	2	Advanced
10	BQL	"Ptica"	3	1,675	1	Advanced
11	Proper	"Ukraden cvet"	4	426	9	Advanced
12	Nika Zorjan	"Uspavanka"	9	676	5	—N/a
13	Marina Martensson	"Blizu"	5	398	10	Advanced
14	Nuška Drašček	"Ne zapusti me zdaj"	10	799	4	Advanced
15	Gregor Ravnik	"Zdaj je čas"	11	506	6	—N/a
16	Lea Sirk	"Hvala, ne!"	1	1,264	3	Advanced

==== Final ====
The final of EMA 2018 took place on 24 February 2018, hosted by Vid Valič and Raiven. All competing songs were required to be performed in Slovene during the semi-final of the competition, while in the final the song was required to be performed in the language that the artist intended to perform in at the Eurovision Song Contest. Two of the entries competed in English ("Promise" performed by BQL and "Glow" performed by Ina Shai), while the other six entries remained in Slovene. In addition to the performances of the competing entries, Jernej Kozan, 2005 and 2017 Slovenian Eurovision entrant Omar Naber, 2011 Slovenian Eurovision entrant Amaya performed as guests. The combination of points from six thematical juries and a public televote selected "Hvala, ne!" performed by Lea Sirk as the winner. The juries consisted of representatives of OGAE Slovenia, songwriters, radio personalities, television personalities, music performers and international artists.

Final – 24 February 2018
R/O	Artist	Song	Jury	Televote		Total	Place
R/O	Artist	Song	Jury	Votes	Points	Total	Place
1	Lea Sirk	"Hvala, ne!"	68	2,556	48	116	1
2	Indigo	"Vesna"	18	678	0	18	7
3	Ina Shai	"Glow"	26	709	12	38	6
4	BQL	"Promise"	34	4,734	72	106	2
5	Marina Martensson	"Blizu"	10	647	0	10	8
6	Lara Kadis	"Zdaj sem tu"	38	1,788	36	74	4
7	Proper	"Ukraden cvet"	30	1,283	24	54	5
8	Nuška Drašček	"Ne zapusti me zdaj"	28	3,069	60	88	3

Detailed Jury Votes
R/O	Song	OGAE	Songwriters	Radio	Television	Performers	International	Total
1	"Hvala, ne!"	12	12	12	12	12	8	68
2	"Vesna"	6		10	2			18
3	"Glow"		2	4		8	12	26
4	"Promise"	8	8	2		10	6	34
5	"Blizu"			6	4			10
6	"Zdaj sem tu"	10	6	8	6	6	2	38
7	"Ukraden cvet"	2	10		10	4	4	30
8	"Ne zapusti me zdaj"	4	4		8	2	10	28

Members of the Jury
Jury	Members
OGAE Slovenia	Miran Cvetko; Irena Žakelj; Gorazd Povšič; Roman Prošek; David Sopotnik
Songwriters	Robi Pikl; Nikola Sekulović; Miha Guštin; Neisha; Boštjan Grabnar
Radio personalities	Žiga Klančar (Val 202); Blaž Maljevac (Radio Koper); Aida Kurtović (Radio Prvi); Gregor Stermecki (Radio Maribor); Marjan Kokol (Radio Si)
Television personalities	Mario Galunič; Emi Den Baruca; Matic Zadravec; Klavdija Kopina; Urška Žnidaršič
Music performers	Maja Keuc; Nuša Derenda; Hannah Mancini; Darja Švajger; Omar Naber
International artists	Dami Im (Australia); Kristian Kostov (Bulgaria); Bojana Stamenov (Serbia); Emmelie de Forest (Denmark); Aminata Savadogo (Latvia)

=== Promotion ===
Lea Sirk made several appearances across Europe to specifically promote "Hvala, ne!" as the Slovenian Eurovision entry. Between 8 and 11 April, Lea Sirk took part in promotional activities in Tel Aviv, Israel and performed during the Israel Calling event held at the Rabin Square. On 14 April, Sirk performed during the Eurovision in Concert event which was held at the AFAS Live venue in Amsterdam, Netherlands and hosted by Edsilia Rombley and Cornald Maas. On 21 April, Sirk performed during the ESPreParty event which was held at the Sala La Riviera venue in Madrid, Spain and hosted by Soraya Arnelas.

== At Eurovision ==
According to Eurovision rules, all nations with the exceptions of the host country and the "Big Five" (France, Germany, Italy, Spain and the United Kingdom) are required to qualify from one of two semi-finals in order to compete for the final; the top ten countries from each semi-final progress to the final. The European Broadcasting Union (EBU) split up the competing countries into six different pots based on voting patterns from previous contests, with countries with favourable voting histories put into the same pot. On 29 January 2018, a special allocation draw was held which placed each country into one of the two semi-finals, as well as which half of the show they would perform in. Slovenia was placed into the second semi-final, to be held on 10 May 2018, and was scheduled to perform in the second half of the show.

Once all the competing songs for the 2018 contest had been released, the running order for the semi-finals was decided by the shows' producers rather than through another draw, so that similar songs were not placed next to each other. Slovenia was set to perform in position 17, following the entry from Montenegro and before the entry from Ukraine.

In Slovenia, the semi-finals were televised on TV SLO 2 and the final was televised on TV SLO 1. All shows featured commentary by Andrej Hofer. The Slovenian spokesperson, who announced the top 12-point score awarded by the Slovenian jury during the final, was Maja Keuc who represented Slovenia in the Eurovision Song Contest 2011.

=== Semi-final ===
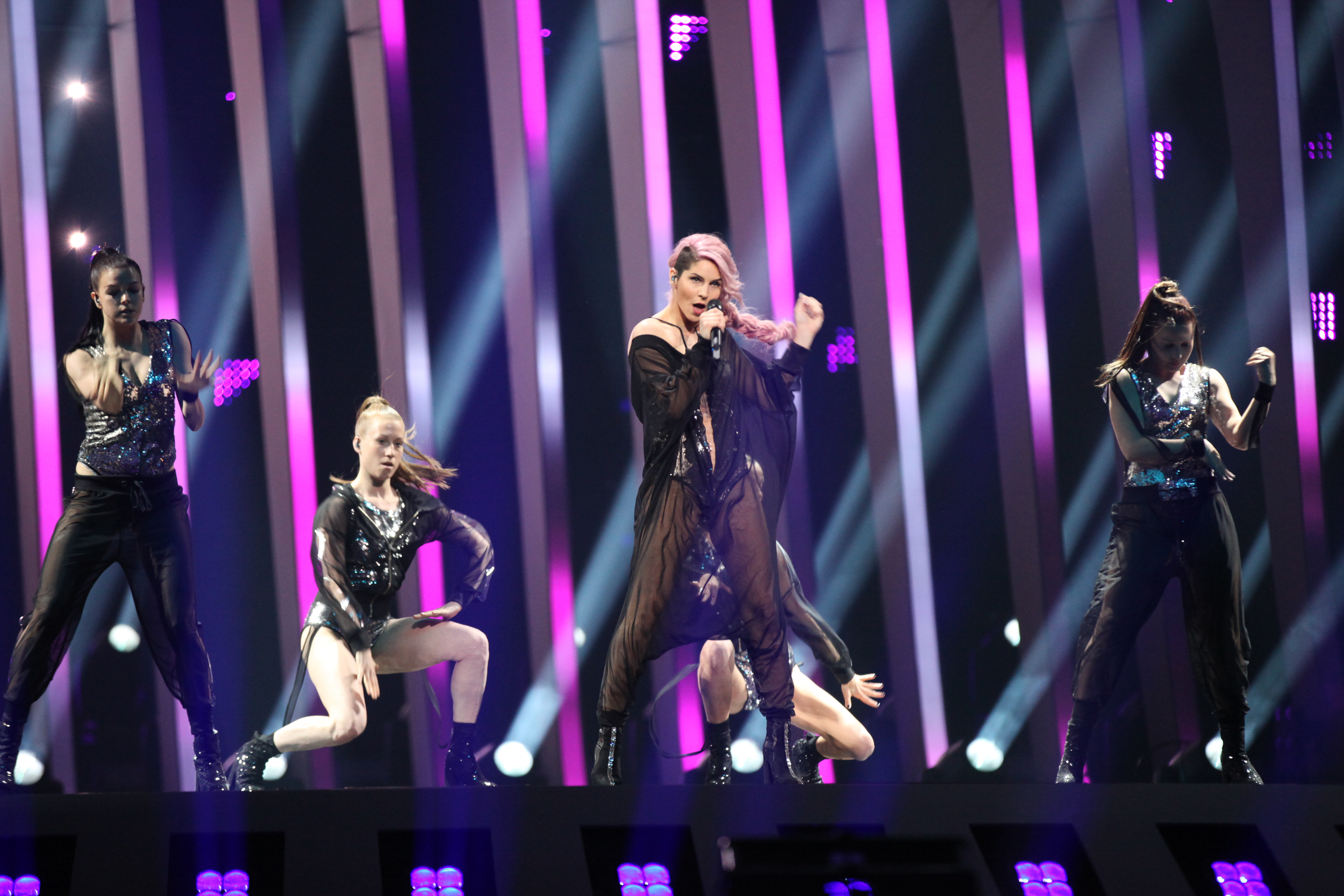
Lea Sirk during a rehearsal before the second semi-final

Lea Sirk took part in technical rehearsals on 2 and 5 May, followed by dress rehearsals on 9 and 10 May. This included the jury show on 9 May where the professional juries of each country watched and voted on the competing entries.

The Slovenian performance featured Lea Sirk performing in a black body suit, joined by four dancers on stage where they performed a synchronised choreographed routine. The performers made use of the outer circle of the stage during the second chorus of the song, during which Sirk stopped the music for a temporary break to interact with the audience. Sirk sang the last chorus of "Hvala, ne!" in Portuguese. The Slovenian performance was choreographed by Erik Bukovnik. The dancers featured during the performance were Karin Putrih, Tajda Kozamelj, Veronika Škrlj and Anja Möderndorfer. Lea Sirk was also joined by an off-stage backing vocalist: Karin Zemljič.

At the end of the show, Slovenia was announced as having finished in the top 10 and subsequently qualifying for the grand final. It was later revealed that Slovenia placed eighth in the semi-final, receiving a total of 132 points: 65 points from the televoting and 67 points from the juries.

=== Final ===
Shortly after the second semi-final, a winners' press conference was held for the ten qualifying countries. As part of this press conference, the qualifying artists took part in a draw to determine which half of the grand final they would subsequently participate in. This draw was done in the order the countries were announced during the semi-final. Slovenia was drawn to compete in the first half. Following this draw, the shows' producers decided upon the running order of the final, as they had done for the semi-finals. Slovenia was subsequently placed to perform in position 3, following the entry from Spain and before the entry from Lithuania.

Lea Sirk once again took part in dress rehearsals on 11 and 12 May before the final, including the jury final where the professional juries cast their final votes before the live show. Lea Sirk performed a repeat of her semi-final performance during the final on 12 May. Slovenia placed twenty-second in the final, scoring 64 points: 23 points from the televoting and 41 points from the juries.

=== Voting ===
Voting during the three shows involved each country awarding two sets of points from 1–8, 10 and 12: one from their professional jury and the other from televoting. Each nation's jury consisted of five music industry professionals who are citizens of the country they represent, with their names published before the contest to ensure transparency. This jury judged each entry based on: vocal capacity; the stage performance; the song's composition and originality; and the overall impression by the act. In addition, no member of a national jury was permitted to be related in any way to any of the competing acts in such a way that they cannot vote impartially and independently. The individual rankings of each jury member as well as the nation's televoting results were released shortly after the grand final.

Below is a breakdown of points awarded to Slovenia and awarded by Slovenia in the second semi-final and grand final of the contest, and the breakdown of the jury voting and televoting conducted during the two shows:

==== Points awarded to Slovenia ====
Points awarded to Slovenia (Semi-final 2)
Score	Televote	Jury
12 points		
10 points	Montenegro	
8 points	Serbia	Netherlands; Sweden
7 points		
6 points	Poland; Ukraine	Moldova
5 points	Hungary; Italy	France; Norway; Poland; Ukraine
4 points	Australia	Denmark; Latvia; Romania
3 points	Denmark; Netherlands; Norway; San Marino; Sweden	Germany; San Marino
2 points	France; Germany; Russia	Australia; Italy; Serbia
1 point		Georgia

Points awarded to Slovenia (Final)
Score	Televote	Jury
12 points		
10 points		
8 points	Serbia	
7 points	Croatia	Czech Republic
6 points	Montenegro	San Marino
5 points		Austria; Ukraine
4 points		Belarus; Israel
3 points		Portugal
2 points	Macedonia	France; Macedonia
1 point		Latvia; Netherlands; Romania

==== Points awarded by Slovenia ====
Points awarded by Slovenia (Semi-final 2)
Score	Televote	Jury
12 points	Serbia	Sweden
10 points	Norway	Netherlands
8 points	Denmark	Malta
7 points	Montenegro	Norway
6 points	Moldova	Romania
5 points	Hungary	Moldova
4 points	Australia	Serbia
3 points	Ukraine	Hungary
2 points	Sweden	Australia
1 point	Netherlands	Montenegro

Points awarded by Slovenia (Final)
Score	Televote	Jury
12 points	Serbia	Sweden
10 points	Italy	Austria
8 points	Czech Republic	Cyprus
7 points	Denmark	Netherlands
6 points	Cyprus	Moldova
5 points	Norway	Estonia
4 points	Germany	Albania
3 points	Hungary	Czech Republic
2 points	Austria	France
1 point	Albania	Israel

==== Detailed voting results ====
The following members comprised the Slovene jury:

- Sara Briški Cirman (Raiven; jury chairperson) – singer, musician, harpist, would go on to represent Slovenia in the Eurovision Song Contest 2024
- Martin Štibernik (Mistermarsh) – composer, singer, producer
- Nikola Sekulovič – musician
- Mitja Bobič – musician, singer, producer
- Alenka Godec – singer

Detailed voting results from Slovenia (Semi-final 2)
R/O	Country	Jury							Televote	
R/O	Country	Raiven	Mistermarsh	N. Sekulovič	M. Bobič	A. Godec	Rank	Points	Rank	Points
01	Norway	8	4	6	3	2	4	7	2	10
02	Romania	2	5	11	7	5	5	6	16	
03	Serbia	5	9	9	9	8	7	4	1	12
04	San Marino	15	11	15	16	16	16		17	
05	Denmark	14	12	7	11	14	12		3	8
06	Russia	16	10	14	17	15	15		11	
07	Moldova	9	7	3	5	6	6	5	5	6
08	Netherlands	4	2	4	2	3	2	10	10	1
09	Australia	6	8	17	10	7	9	2	7	4
10	Georgia	12	13	10	13	10	14		14	
11	Poland	17	17	16	15	17	17		15	
12	Malta	3	3	2	6	4	3	8	12	
13	Hungary	7	16	5	8	13	8	3	6	5
14	Latvia	10	6	12	14	11	11		13	
15	Sweden	1	1	1	1	1	1	12	9	2
16	Montenegro	13	14	13	4	9	10	1	4	7
17	Slovenia									
18	Ukraine	11	15	8	12	12	13		8	3

Detailed voting results from Slovenia (Final)
R/O	Country	Jury							Televote	
R/O	Country	Raiven	Mistermarsh	N. Sekulovič	M. Bobič	A. Godec	Rank	Points	Rank	Points
01	Ukraine	24	20	24	25	24	24		13	
02	Spain	21	13	13	22	18	20		21	
03	Slovenia									
04	Lithuania	16	11	11	15	7	12		24	
05	Austria	2	3	8	1	2	2	10	9	2
06	Estonia	3	12	5	5	22	6	5	16	
07	Norway	18	14	18	12	8	17		6	5
08	Portugal	25	21	25	23	23	25		25	
09	United Kingdom	22	19	15	10	10	18		23	
10	Serbia	9	16	9	17	13	15		1	12
11	Germany	11	17	19	18	5	14		7	4
12	Albania	8	10	6	7	4	7	4	10	1
13	France	5	7	10	13	16	9	2	11	
14	Czech Republic	7	8	22	9	3	8	3	3	8
15	Denmark	20	23	14	24	25	22		4	7
16	Australia	19	18	23	20	21	23		14	
17	Finland	4	15	21	19	17	13		22	
18	Bulgaria	17	9	20	16	15	19		20	
19	Moldova	12	5	3	6	12	5	6	15	
20	Sweden	1	2	1	2	1	1	12	19	
21	Hungary	15	24	17	21	20	21		8	3
22	Israel	23	22	2	11	19	10	1	12	
23	Netherlands	6	4	7	3	6	4	7	18	
24	Ireland	14	25	16	8	11	16		17	
25	Cyprus	10	1	4	4	9	3	8	5	6
26	Italy	13	6	12	14	14	11		2	10
