= Slovenia in the Eurovision Song Contest 2017 =

- Eurovision Song Contest 2017
- Participating broadcaster: Radiotelevizija Slovenija (RTVSLO)
- Country: Slovenia
- Selection process: Evrovizijska Melodija 2017
- Selection date: 24 February 2017

Competing entry
- Song: "On My Way"
- Artist: Omar Naber
- Songwriters: Omar Naber

Placement
- Semi-final result: Failed to qualify (17th)

Participation chronology

Slovenia was represented at the Eurovision Song Contest 2017 with the song "On My Way" written and performed by Omar Naber. The Slovene participating broadcaster, Radiotelevizija Slovenija (RTVSLO), organised the national selection Evrovizijska Melodija 2017 in order to select its entry for the contest. 16 entries competed in the national final which consisted of three shows: two semi-finals and a final. Entries were selected to advance from each semi-final based on a public televote and a jury panel. Eight entries qualified to compete in the final where "On My Way" performed by Omar Naber was selected as the winner following the combination of votes from six regional juries and a public televote. Naber had previously represented Slovenia in 2005 where he failed to qualify to the final with the song "Stop".

Slovenia was drawn to compete in the first semi-final of the Eurovision Song Contest which took place on 9 May 2017. Performing during the show in position 17, "On My Way" was not announced among the top 10 entries of the first semi-final and therefore did not qualify to compete in the final. It was later revealed that Slovenia placed seventeenth out of the 18 participating countries in the semi-final with 36 points.

== Background ==
Prior to the 2017 contest, Radiotelevizija Slovenija (RTVSLO) had participated in the Eurovision Song Contest representing Slovenia twenty-two times since its first entry in 1993. Its highest placing in the contest, to this point, has been seventh place, achieved on two occasions: in 1995 with the song "Prisluhni mi" performed by Darja Švajger and in 2001 with the song "Energy" performed by Nuša Derenda. The country's only other top ten result was achieved in 1997 when Tanja Ribič performing "Zbudi se" placed tenth. Since the introduction of semi-finals to the format of the contest in 2004, Slovenia had thus far only managed to qualify to the final on four occasions. In 2016, "Blue and Red" performed by ManuElla failed to qualify to the final.

As part of its duties as participating broadcaster, RTVSLO organises the selection of its entry in the Eurovision Song Contest and broadcasts the event in the country. The broadcaster confirmed its participation in the 2017 contest on 20 July 2016. RTVSLO has traditionally selected its entry through a national final entitled Evrovizijska Melodija (EMA), which has been produced with variable formats. To this point, the broadcaster has only foregone the use of this national final in 2013 when the entry was internally selected. For 2017, the broadcaster opted to organise Evrovizijska Melodija 2017 (EMA 2017) to select its entry.

== Before Eurovision ==
=== EMA 2017 ===
EMA 2017 was the 21st edition of the Slovenian national final format Evrovizijska Melodija (EMA). The competition was used by RTV Slovenija to select Slovenia's entry for the Eurovision Song Contest 2017, and consisted of three shows that commenced on 17 February 2017 and concluded on 24 February 2017. All shows in the competition took place at the Gospodarsko razstavišče in Ljubljana and were broadcast on TV SLO 1, Radio Val 202, Radio Koper, Radio Maribor and online via the broadcaster's RTV 4D platform.

==== Format ====
The format of the competition consisted of three televised shows: two semi-finals held on 17 and 18 February 2017 and a final held on 24 February 2017. Eight songs competed in each semi-final and a public televote first selected two entries to proceed to the final. An expert jury then selected an additional two finalists out of the six remaining songs. Eight songs competed in the final where the winner was selected following the 50/50 combination of points from six regional juries and a public televote. Each jury assigned points as follows: 1–8, 10 and 12, while the televote assigned points that had a weighting equal to the votes of six jury groups. The song that received the highest overall score when the votes were combined was determined the winner.

==== Competing entries ====
Artists and composers were able to submit their entries to the broadcaster between 20 July 2016 and 3 November 2016. 90 entries were received by the broadcaster during the submission period. An expert committee consisting of ManuElla (2016 Slovenian Eurovision entrant), Boštjan Grabnar (musician, composer and music producer), Aleksander Radić (Head of the Slovenian delegation at the Eurovision Song Contest) and Jernej Vene (music editor for Radio Val 202) selected sixteen artists and songs for the competition from the received submissions. The competing artists were announced on 4 December 2016. Among the competing artists were former Slovenian Eurovision contestants Omar Naber who represented Slovenia in 2005 and Maja Keuc (Amaya) who represented Slovenia in 2011. On 20 January 2017, Amaya announced that she would be withdrawing from the competition on the advice of her record label; she was replaced with the song "Tok ti sede" performed by Clemens.

Artist	Song	Songwriter(s)
Alya	"Halo"	Raay, Rok Lunaček, Tina Piš
BQL	"Heart of Gold"	Maraaya, Anej Piletič
Clemens	"Tok ti sede"	Klemen Mramor
Ina Shai	"Colour Me"	Martina Šraj
Kataya and Duncan Kamakana	"Are You There"	Tim Žibrat, Duncan Kamakana, Katja Ajster
King Foo	"Wild Ride"	Rok Golob, Cherie Lucas
Lea Sirk	"Freedom"	Lea Sirk, Gaber Radojevič
Nika Zorjan	"Fse"	Maraaya, Nika Zorjan
Nuška Drašček	"Flower in the Snow"	Pele Loriano, Lina Button, Brendan Wade
Omar Naber	"On My Way"	Omar Naber
Raiven	"Zažarim"	Jernej Kržič, Tadej Košir, Sara Briški Cirman
Sell Out	"Ni panike"	Miha Gorše, Uroš Obranovič, Tina Muc
Tim Kores	"Open Fire"	Jeff Lewis, Drew Lawrence
Tosca Beat	"Free World"	Andraž Kržič, Tosca Beat, Peter Penko
United Pandaz and Arsello feat. Alex Volasko	"Heart to Heart"	Arsello, Alex Volasko
Zala	"Lalalatino"	Zala Đurić Ribič

==== Semi-finals ====
The two semi-finals of EMA 2017 took place on 17 and 18 February 2017, hosted by Tina Gorenjak, Maja Martina Merljak and Tanja Kocman. In addition to the performances of the competing entries, Veseli svatje, 2012 Slovenian Eurovision entrant Eva Boto and 2016 Slovenian Eurovision entrant ManuElla performed as guests during the first semi-final, while Samuel Lucas and Alenka Godec performed as guests during the second semi-final. In each semi-final, the eight competing entries first faced a public televote where the top two proceeded to the final; an additional two qualifiers were then selected out of the remaining six entries by a seven-member jury panel. The jury consisted of Eva Boto, Martin Štibernik (singer, composer and music producer), Alenka Godec (singer), Rebeka Dremelj (2008 Slovenian Eurovision entrant), Patrik Greblo (conductor and composer), Jernej Dirnbek (musician) and Anika Horvat (singer).

Public vote qualifier Jury qualifier

Semi-final 1 – 17 February 2017
R/O	Artist	Song	Jury	Televote		Result
R/O	Artist	Song	Jury	Votes	Rank	Result
1	King Foo	"Wild Ride"	2	407	8	Advanced
2	Nika Zorjan	"Fse"	3	1,185	4	Advanced
3	Tosca Beat	"Free World"	5	1,270	3	—N/a
4	Lea Sirk	"Freedom"	4	879	5	—N/a
5	Sell Out	"Ni panike"	8	1,828	2	Advanced
6	Zala	"Lalalatino"	7	412	7	—N/a
7	Alya	"Halo"	6	864	6	—N/a
8	Omar Naber	"On My Way"	1	2,506	1	Advanced

Semi-final 2 – 24 February 2017
R/O	Artist	Song	Jury	Televote		Result
R/O	Artist	Song	Jury	Votes	Rank	Result
1	Clemens	"Tok ti sede"	6	253	8	—N/a
2	Raiven	"Zažarim"	4	1,467	3	Advanced
3	Kataya and Duncan Kamakana	"Are You There"	8	724	6	—N/a
4	BQL	"Heart of Gold"	3	3,486	1	Advanced
5	Ina Shai	"Colour Me"	5	788	5	—N/a
6	United Pandaz and Arsello feat. Alex Volasko	"Heart to Heart"	7	370	7	—N/a
7	Tim Kores	"Open Fire"	2	899	4	Advanced
8	Nuška Drašček	"Flower in the Snow"	1	1,687	2	Advanced

==== Final ====
The final of EMA 2017 took place on 24 February 2017, hosted by Tina Gorenjak, Maja Martina Merljak, Tanja Kocman and Mario Galunič. In addition to the performances of the competing entries, 1994 Croatian Eurovision entrant Toni Cetinski, 2016 Slovenian Eurovision entrant ManuElla and 2016 Eurovision winner Jamala performed as guests. The combination of points from six regional juries and a public televote selected "On My Way" performed by Omar Naber as the winner.

Final – 24 February 2017
R/O	Artist	Song	Jury	Televote		Total	Place
R/O	Artist	Song	Jury	Votes	Points	Total	Place
1	Sell Out	"Ni panike"	0	2,335	24	24	6
2	Nuška Drašček	"Flower in the Snow"	56	2,032	12	68	4
3	Tim Kores	"Open Fire"	10	1,543	0	10	8
4	Nika Zorjan	"Fse"	20	2,419	36	56	5
5	King Foo	"Wild Ride"	14	918	0	14	7
6	Omar Naber	"On My Way"	64	5,165	60	124	1
7	BQL	"Heart of Gold"	42	13,134	72	114	2
8	Raiven	"Zažarim"	46	3,292	48	94	3

Detailed regional jury votes
R/O	Song	Ljubljana	Kranj	Maribor	Koper	Novo Mesto	Celje	Total
1	"Ni panike"							0
2	"Flower in the Snow"	8	8	10	10	10	10	56
3	"Open Fire”			2	4	4		10
4	"Fse"	2	6	4	2	2	4	20
5	"Wild Ride"	4	4				6	14
6	"On My Way"	10	12	12	12	6	12	64
7	"Heart of Gold"	12	2	6	6	8	8	42
8	"Zažarim"	6	10	8	8	12	2	46
Members of the jury
Ljubljana: Alenka Godec, Aleš Klinar, Martin Štibernik; Kranj: Darja Švajger, Manca Izmajlova, Tina Marinšek; Maribor: Bilbi, Eva Boto, Primož Štorman; Koper: Andrea F., Anika Horvat, Steffy; Novo Mesto: Gašper Rifelj, Ivo Rimc, Tomislav Jovanović - Tokac; Celje: ManuElla, Matic Jere, Sanja Mlinar Marin

=== Promotion ===
Omar Naber made several appearances across Europe to specifically promote "On My Way" as the Slovenian Eurovision entry. On 2 April, Naber performed during the London Eurovision Party, which was held at the Café de Paris venue in London, United Kingdom and hosted by Nicki French and Paddy O'Connell. Between 3 and 6 April, Naber took part in promotional activities in Tel Aviv, Israel where he performed during the Israel Calling event held at the Ha'teatron venue. On 8 April, Omar Naber performed during the Eurovision in Concert event which was held at the Melkweg venue in Amsterdam, Netherlands and hosted by Cornald Maas and Selma Björnsdóttir.

== At Eurovision ==
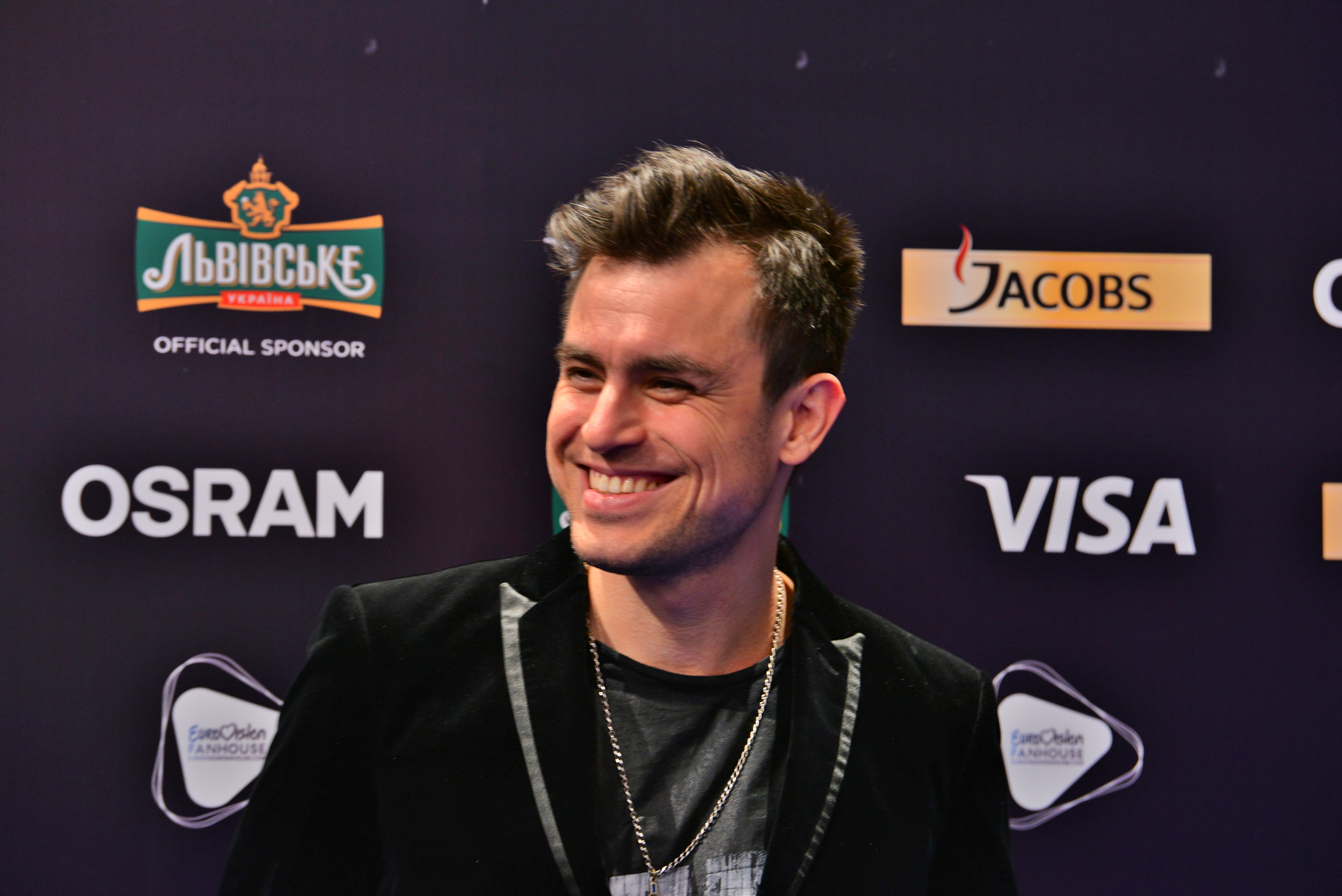
Omar Naber during a press meet and greet

According to Eurovision rules, all nations with the exceptions of the host country and the "Big Five" (France, Germany, Italy, Spain and the United Kingdom) are required to qualify from one of two semi-finals in order to compete for the final; the top ten countries from each semi-final progress to the final. The European Broadcasting Union (EBU) split up the competing countries into six different pots based on voting patterns from previous contests, with countries with favourable voting histories put into the same pot. On 31 January 2017, a special allocation draw was held which placed each country into one of the two semi-finals, as well as which half of the show they would perform in. Slovenia was placed into the first semi-final, to be held on 9 May 2017, and was scheduled to perform in the second half of the show.

Once all the competing songs for the 2017 contest had been released, the running order for the semi-finals was decided by the shows' producers rather than through another draw, so that similar songs were not placed next to each other. Slovenia was set to perform in position 17, following the entry from Armenia and before the entry from Latvia.

In Slovenia, the semi-finals were televised on TV SLO 2 and the final was televised on TV SLO 1. All shows featured commentary by Andrej Hofer. The contest was also broadcast via radio with the second semi-final and final airing on Radio Val 202 and all three shows airing on Radio Maribor. The Slovenian spokesperson, who announced the top 12-point score awarded by the Slovenian jury during the final, was Katarina Čas.

=== Semi-final ===
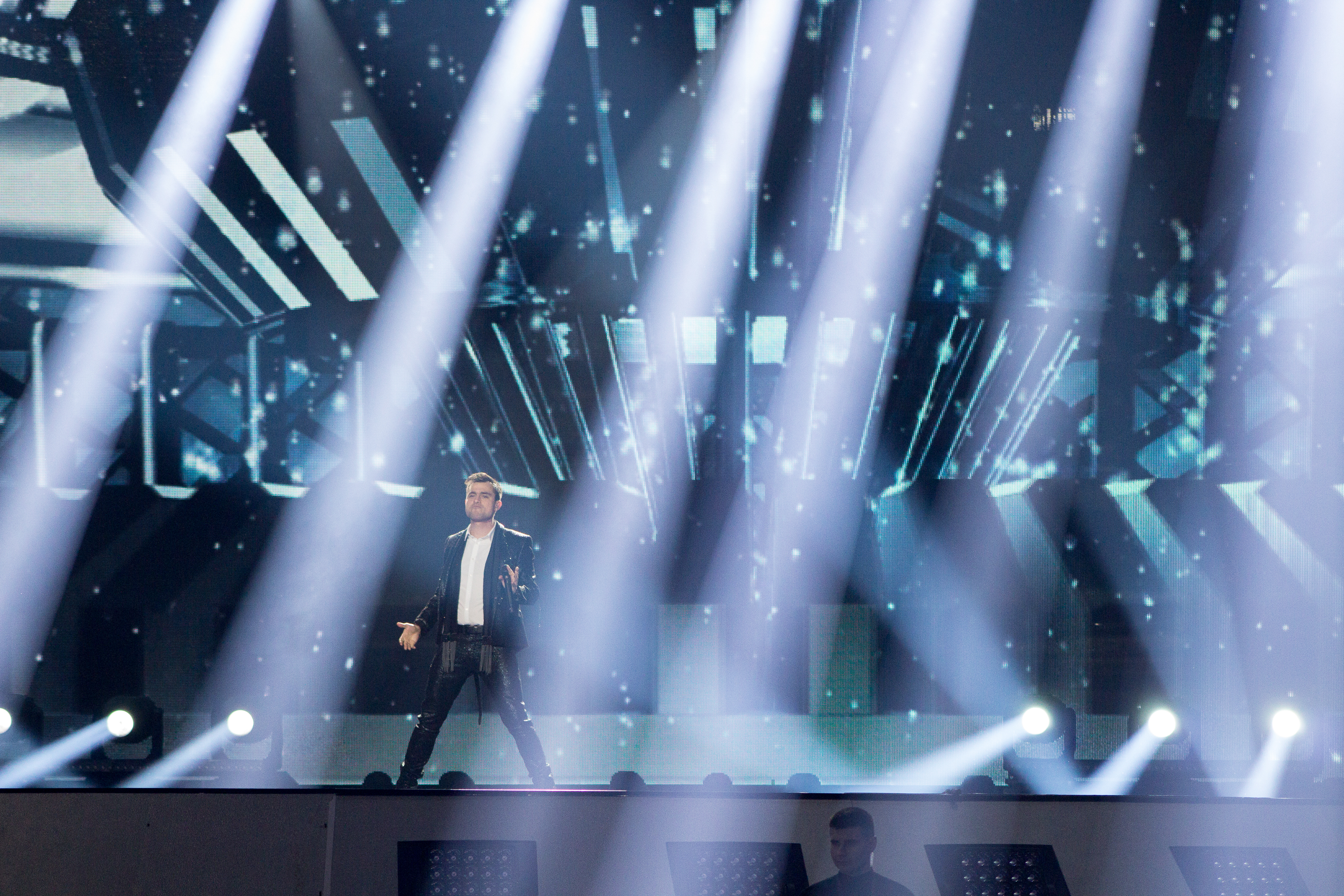
Omar Naber during a rehearsal before the first semi-final

Omar Naber took part in technical rehearsals on 1 and 5 May, followed by dress rehearsals on 8 and 9 May. This included the jury show on 8 May where the professional juries of each country watched and voted on the competing entries.

The Slovenian performance featured Omar Naber performing alone in a black leather suit. The stage colours were black, blue and white and the performance also featured the use of the chandelier on stage and mini screens belonging to the chandelier that were lowered for the first half of the song, with Naber in the centre of them, and raised up later on during the performance.

At the end of the show, Slovenia was not announced among the top 10 entries in the first semi-final and therefore failed to qualify to compete in the final. It was later revealed that Slovenia placed seventeenth in the semi-final, receiving a total of 36 points: 20 points from the televoting and 16 points from the juries.

=== Voting ===
Voting during the three shows involved each country awarding two sets of points from 1–8, 10 and 12: one from their professional jury and the other from televoting. Each nation's jury consisted of five music industry professionals who are citizens of the country they represent, with their names published before the contest to ensure transparency. This jury judged each entry based on: vocal capacity; the stage performance; the song's composition and originality; and the overall impression by the act. In addition, no member of a national jury was permitted to be related in any way to any of the competing acts in such a way that they cannot vote impartially and independently. The individual rankings of each jury member as well as the nation's televoting results were released shortly after the grand final.

Below is a breakdown of points awarded to Slovenia and awarded by Slovenia in the first semi-final and grand final of the contest, and the breakdown of the jury voting and televoting conducted during the two shows:

==== Points awarded to Slovenia ====
Points awarded to Slovenia (Semi-final 1)
Score	Televote	Jury
12 points		
10 points		
8 points	Montenegro	
7 points		
6 points		
5 points		Poland
4 points	Portugal	Georgia; Spain
3 points	Poland	
2 points	Belgium; Finland	
1 point	Czech Republic	Finland; Montenegro; Sweden

==== Points awarded by Slovenia ====
Points awarded by Slovenia (Semi-final 1)
Score	Televote	Jury
12 points	Portugal	Australia
10 points	Moldova	Czech Republic
8 points	Belgium	Portugal
7 points	Azerbaijan	Sweden
6 points	Montenegro	Finland
5 points	Sweden	Georgia
4 points	Cyprus	Poland
3 points	Australia	Azerbaijan
2 points	Finland	Belgium
1 point	Albania	Armenia

Points awarded by Slovenia (Final)
Score	Televote	Jury
12 points	Croatia	Portugal
10 points	Italy	United Kingdom
8 points	Portugal	Bulgaria
7 points	Bulgaria	Australia
6 points	Belgium	Sweden
5 points	Hungary	Belgium
4 points	Azerbaijan	Poland
3 points	Moldova	Armenia
2 points	Romania	Italy
1 point	Sweden	Netherlands

==== Detailed voting results ====
The following members comprised the Slovene jury:

- Darja Švajger (jury chairperson) – singer, vocal coach, represented Slovenia in the 1995 and 1999 contests
- Nika Zorjan – singer
- Gaber Radojevič – music producer, composer, audio engineer
- Jernej Dirnbek – musician, lyricist
- Aleksander Lavrini – music editor, sound editor

On 9 May 2017, it was confirmed that Aleksander Lavrini had replaced Mistermash as a member of the Slovene jury.

Detailed voting results from Slovenia (Semi-final 1)
R/O	Country	Jury							Televote	
R/O	Country	N. Zorjan	G. Radojevič	J. Dirnbek	D. Švajger	A. Lavrini	Rank	Points	Rank	Points
01	Sweden	1	1	12	12	1	4	7	6	5
02	Georgia	9	8	3	1	7	6	5	17	
03	Australia	3	2	9	2	2	1	12	8	3
04	Albania	15	11	10	11	12	13		10	1
05	Belgium	13	4	14	9	3	9	2	3	8
06	Montenegro	17	15	17	17	17	17		5	6
07	Finland	10	5	5	4	4	5	6	9	2
08	Azerbaijan	11	10	4	6	9	8	3	4	7
09	Portugal	2	3	2	5	10	3	8	1	12
10	Greece	14	14	11	16	15	15		12	
11	Poland	5	6	8	7	6	7	4	15	
12	Moldova	8	7	13	13	16	12		2	10
13	Iceland	12	12	7	10	8	11		11	
14	Czech Republic	4	9	1	3	5	2	10	13	
15	Cyprus	6	17	16	15	14	14		7	4
16	Armenia	7	13	6	8	11	10	1	14	
17	Slovenia									
18	Latvia	16	16	15	14	13	16		16	

Detailed voting results from Slovenia (Final)
R/O	Country	Jury							Televote	
R/O	Country	N. Zorjan	G. Radojevič	J. Dirnbek	D. Švajger	A. Lavrini	Rank	Points	Rank	Points
01	Israel	25	19	17	24	18	21		22	
02	Poland	8	9	7	7	12	7	4	25	
03	Belarus	15	14	14	13	13	14		20	
04	Austria	10	7	15	17	9	11		14	
05	Armenia	7	12	8	6	10	8	3	19	
06	Netherlands	17	11	4	11	8	10	1	13	
07	Moldova	6	10	18	14	19	13		8	3
08	Hungary	12	16	22	16	20	18		6	5
09	Italy	18	6	12	5	7	9	2	2	10
10	Denmark	26	15	13	15	15	17		26	
11	Portugal	1	1	1	2	5	1	12	3	8
12	Azerbaijan	13	17	9	10	11	12		7	4
13	Croatia	19	13	16	19	14	15		1	12
14	Australia	5	5	6	4	4	4	7	12	
15	Greece	24	25	20	23	21	25		23	
16	Spain	16	24	24	25	22	23		24	
17	Norway	22	20	10	18	17	19		16	
18	United Kingdom	3	2	3	3	1	2	10	17	
19	Cyprus	9	26	21	20	26	20		15	
20	Romania	23	18	25	26	25	26		9	2
21	Germany	14	22	19	12	16	16		18	
22	Ukraine	21	21	23	22	24	22		21	
23	Belgium	11	8	5	8	6	6	5	5	6
24	Sweden	2	3	11	9	2	5	6	10	1
25	Bulgaria	4	4	2	1	3	3	8	4	7
26	France	20	23	26	21	23	24		11	
