= Omar (album) =

Studio album by Omar Naber
- Released: 2005
- Recorded: 2004
- Genre: Rock
- Label: Nika Records

Omar Naber chronology
Omar (2005)	Kareem (2007)

Singles from Omar
- 1. "Vse, kar si želiš" Released: 2005; 2. "Stop" Released: 2005; 3. "Omar, ti teslo" Released: 2005; 4. "Polje tvojih sanj" Released: 2005; 5. "Skrivaj sanjava" Released: 2005; 6. "Ves tvoj svet" Released: 2005; 7. "Krasen dan" Released: 2005

Omar is the debut studio album from Slovenian singer Omar Naber. It was released in 2005 on CD and MC (cassette) with different track listings on each format. It is not quite clear why this was done, however in many cases it is usually because of spacing on both sides of the cassette, whereas on a CD it doesn't really matter. There are however the same tracks on both formats. The tracks on the album are mainly in Slovenian, however there are four English language versions of tracks already in Slovenian. As with a few albums of this nature, the album was redone with most of the songs rerecorded in Serbian, along with two songs in English, in order to appeal to Serbian speaking audiences. This version also featured a slightly different track listing.

== Singles ==
"Vse, kar si želiš" was released as the lead single from the album. "Stop" was released as the second single from the album. The song represented Slovenia in the Eurovision Song Contest 2005 semi final and it was recorded twice with different orchestration. The second version was the orchestration used at the Eurovision, this version appears on the official Eurovision Song Contest 2005 compilation CD, but not on any version of this album. It does however appear on Omar's 2007 album Kareem. The song was also recorded in English, however as well as different orchestration, there were different lyrics. The original recording was called "On My Own" and the re-recording was called "Go". The Serbian edition of this album featured "Stop" in Croatian, not Serbian. It also features "Go" as opposed to "On My Own", which does not appear on the original CD or MC release. "Omar, ti teslo", "Polje tvojih sanj", "Skrivaj sanjava", "Ves tvoj svet" and "Krasen dan" were released as singles from the album.

== Track listing ==
Standard listing
No.	Title	Length
1.	"Krasen Dan"
2.	"Vse, Kar Si Zelis"
3.	"Ves Tvoj Svet"
4.	"Ni Me Sram"
5.	"Sunny Day" (English version of Vse, Kar Si Zelis)
6.	"It's All Up To You" (English version of Polje Tvojih Sanj)
7.	"Somehow omar" (English version of Dokler Se Ne Zbudim)
8.	"On My Own" (1st English version of Stop, Original orchestration)
9.	"Skrivaj Sanjava"
10.	"Stop" (Original orchestration)
11.	"Polje Tvojih Sanj"
12.	"Dokler Se Ne Zbudim"
13.	"Omar Ti Teslo"

MC listing
No.	Title	Length
1.	"Krasen Dan"
2.	"Vse, Kar Si Zelis"
3.	"Stop" (Original orchestration)
4.	"Polje Tvojih Sanj"
5.	"Skrivaj Sanjava"
6.	"Dokler Se Ne Zbudim"
7.	"Omar Ti Teslo"
8.	"Ves Tvoj Svet"
9.	"Ni Me Spram"
10.	"Sunny Day" (English version of Vse, Kar Si Zelis)
11.	"It's All Up To You" (English version of Polje Tvojih Sanj)
12.	"Somehow" (English version of Dokler Se Ne Zbudim)
13.	"On My Own" (1st English version of Stop, Original orchestration)

Serbian edition
No.	Title	Length
1.	"Novi dan" (Serbian version of Krasen Dan)
2.	"Strah od letenja" (Serbian version of Vse, Kar Si Zelis)
3.	"Ludi od ljubavi" (Serbian version of Polje Tvojih Sanj or It's All Up To You)
4.	"Glavom kroz zid" (Serbian version of Skrivaj Sanjava)
5.	"Ja sanjam" (Serbian version of Dokler Se Ne Zbudim or Somehow)
6.	"Ne vrijedi" (Serbian version of Ves Tvoj Svet)
7.	"Nase je vrijeme" (Serbian version of Omar Ti Teslo)
8.	"Stop" (Croatian version of Stop, ESC Orchestration)
9.	"Priznajem" (Serbian version of Ni Me Spram, with different orchestration)
10.	"Somehow" (English version of Dokler Se Ne Zbudim)
11.	"Go" (2nd English version of Stop, Eurovision Orchestration)

== Release history ==
Region	Date	Format	Label
Slovenia	2005	Digital download, CD	Nika Records
Serbia	2006	Digital download, CD	Automatik Records
