= Omar Naber =

Slovenian singer

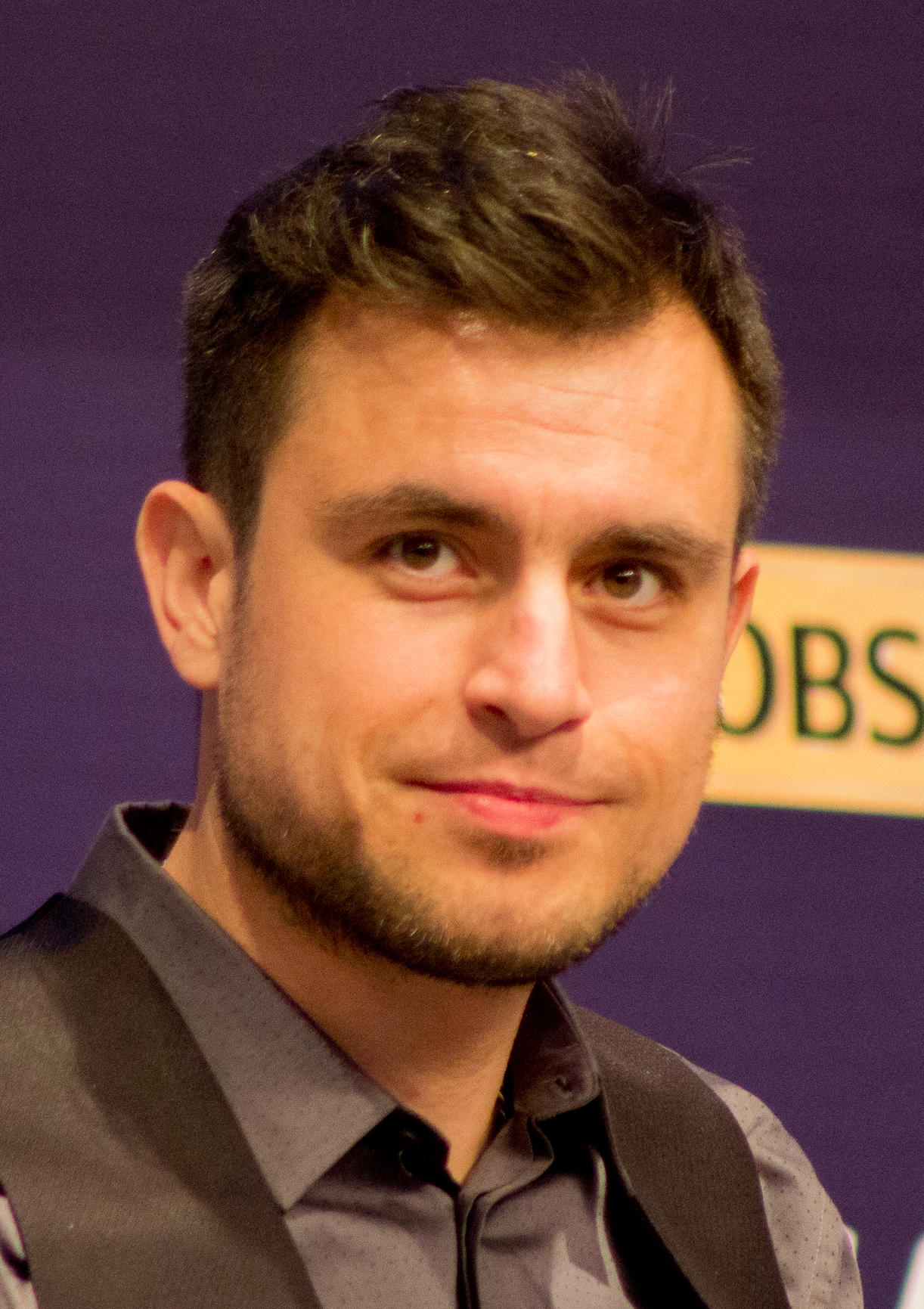
- Naber in 2017

Background information
- Born: Omar Kareem Naber; 7 July 1981 (age 45); Ljubljana, SR Slovenia, SFR Yugoslavia
- Genres: Rock; pop
- Occupations: Singer; songwriter; musician
- Instruments: Vocals; guitar
- Years active: 1999–present
- Labels: Nika Records; Universal Music
- Website: omarnaber.com

Omar Kareem Naber (born 7 July 1981) is a Slovenian singer, songwriter and guitar player. He first represented Slovenia at the Eurovision Song Contest 2005 in Kyiv with the song "Stop" and for a second time at the Eurovision Song Contest 2017 in Kyiv with the song "On My Way", but failed to qualify to the final on both occasions.

== Early life ==
Naber was born on 7 July 1981 in Ljubljana, SR Slovenia, then still part of the Socialist Federal Republic of Yugoslavia. His father, Samir Naber originates from Jordan, and is a dentist by profession working in Ljubljana. His mother, Alenka Naber, is a Slovenian and works as a piano teacher. Like his parents, he was raised Christian. He finished high school diploma as a dental technician and even did six months internship, but soon realized that this was not what he wanted to do in his life. He has been actively involved in music since the age of 16, when he joined Veter (Wind), a mixed choir of Ljubljana high schools. The main inspiration for him wanting to become a musician was Green Day.

== Career ==
=== 1999–2001: early years ===
In 1999, he founded a rock band, with some member changes over the years, but the band is still playing today. He had over 800 gigs with his band in total and another hundred at charity events.

In 2001, he took second place at the local song contest ‘Kdo bo osvojil Triglav’ (Who will conquer Triglav) and immediately signed a contract with Slovenian label Nika Records.

After he signed a contract, he performed as a backing vocalist for various Slovenian artists in studio sessions and live performances. He appeared on different albums for D.D.V., for Saša Vrtnar (‘Persona Non Grata’), for Rok'n'band (‘Elvis je živ’), etc.

=== 2004: Battle of talents ===
In late 2004, Naber won Bitka talentov, the Slovenian version of the Battle of the Talents and became nationally recognized. That year, he also recorded his first song and video "Vse kar si želiš" (Anything you want), released as a single on his Omar album the following year.

=== 2005: first Eurovision performance ===
As a winner of this battle, he performed and won at the EMA 2005, the Slovenian national selection for Eurovision. He participated in the Eurovision Song Contest 2005 with the song "Stop" (in Slovene), a song he had composed himself, along with Urša Vlašič. He failed to qualify to the final, however, finishing in 12th place with 69 points.

His first album Omar was also released in 2005. He spent 2006 touring Slovenia, as well as internationally, and eventually went back to the studio to record his second album with his band Kareem. This second album, named Kareem, was released in 2007.

In 2011, Naber was sentenced to serve seven months in prison for sexually assaulting a woman in a Ljubljana club.

=== 2014: third album ===
In 2014, he first released his third album Na glavo in Slovenia, along with its English version No Helmet a couple of months later in England.

=== 2017: second Eurovision performance ===
He won EMA 2017 and once again became the national representative for Slovenia in the Eurovision Song Contest 2017 with the song "On My Way". However, he also failed to qualify for the final, finishing 17th (second-last) with 36 points in the first semi-final.

== Discography ==
=== Albums ===
Title	Details
Omar	Released: 2005 (Slovenia); Label: Nika Records; Format: Digital download, CD
Omar (Serbian release)	Released: 2006 (Serbia); Label: Automatik Records; Format: Digital download, CD
Kareem	Released: 2007 (Slovenia); Label: Nika Records; Format: Digital download, CD
Na Glavo	Released: 6 March 2014 (Slovenia); Label: Nika Records; Format: Digital download, CD
No Helmet	Released: 28 September 2014 (United Kingdom); Label: Nika Records; Format: Digital download, CD

=== Singles ===
Title	Year	Peak chart positions	Album
Title	Year	SLO	Album
"Vse, kar si želiš"	2005	—	Omar
"Stop"	2005	—	Omar
"Omar, ti teslo"	2005	—	Omar
"Polje tvojih sanj"	2005	—	Omar
"Skrivaj sanjava"	2005	—	Omar
"Ves tvoj svet"	2005	—	Omar
"Krasen dan"	2005	—	Omar
"Poseben dan"	2007	—	Kareem
"Vse, kar imam"	2007	—	Kareem
"Vladarjev um"	2007	—	Kareem
"Sanjam"	2008	—	Na glavo
"I Still Carry On"	2009	—	Na glavo
"Proti soncu"	2010	—	Na glavo
"Preden greš"	2010	—	Na glavo
"Let me go"	2011	—	No Helmet
"Bistvo skrito je očem"	2011	—	Na glavo
"Mute & Loud"	2012	—	No Helmet
"Parfum"	2012	—	Na glavo
"Sedem dni"	2012	—	Na glavo
"Žamet"	2014	—	Na glavo
"Sladek strup (I Won't Give Up)"	2014	—	No Helmet
"Hej, ti! (Play!)"	2015	—	Non-album singles
"Zgodba brez napake"	2016	—	Non-album singles
"Hallelujah"	2016	—	Non-album singles
"Take Me Far"	2016	—	Non-album singles
"Poseben dan '16"	2016	—	Non-album singles
"Basket Case"	2017	—	Non-album singles
"Aleppo"	2017	—	Non-album singles
"Placebo"	2017	—	Non-album singles
"Ne zapusti me"	2017	—	Non-album singles
"On My Way"	2017	12	Non-album singles
"Tam nekje"	2017	—	Non-album singles
"I Still Believe in You"	2018	—	Non-album singles
"Rad bi spet verjel"	2018	—	Non-album singles
"Mamma Maria"	2020	—	Non-album singles
"Cesta in nebo"	2020	—	Non-album singles
"Posebn model"	2023	—	Non-album singles
"—" denotes a recording that did not chart or was not released in that territory.

=== Other appearances ===
Title	Year	Album	Notes
En spodrsljaj	2006	Chicken Little (Non-Album singles)	Slovene version of One Little Slip by Barenaked Ladies, it appears in the Slovene dub of Chicken Little.
Vse, kar vem	2006	Chicken Little (Non-Album singles)	Slovene version of Five for Fighting's version of All I Know, it appears in the Slovene dub of Chicken Little.
Kaj bova zdej	2008	Napačni Toni	Performs as a featured artist with Slovenian rapper "Kosta".
Duša moje duše	2011	Za stare čase	Duet with Nuša Derenda.
En svet / One World	2015	En svet / One World	charity single performed in supergroup "Slove'n'aid" in both Slovene and English.
Placebo	2017	Non-Album singles	Performs as a featured artist with Slovenian rapper "Vauks"
Aleppo	2017	Non-Album singles	Duet with Bojan Cvjetićanin, performed in both Slovene and English
Miže	2017	Dnevi slovenske zabavne glasbe 2017 - Popevka	Track only released in this compilation.
Fight For Victory!	2020	Bad Boyz (Original Motion Picture Soundtrack)	Performed alongside dbMix, it appears in the Irish indie film Bad Boyz.

== Failed Eurovision attempts ==
He entered the national selection for Slovenia three more times and one more time for Switzerland, not proceeding to the main contest on either occasion:

- Slovenia – "I Still Carry On" (2009)
- Slovenia – "Bistvo skrito je očem" (2011)
- Slovenia – "I Won't Give Up" (2014)
- Switzerland – "Take Me Far" (2016)

Awards and achievements
Preceded by Platin with "Stay Forever"	Slovenia in the Eurovision Song Contest; 2005	Succeeded by Anžej Dežan with "Mr Nobody"
Preceded by ManuElla with "Blue and Red"	Slovenia in the Eurovision Song Contest; 2017	Succeeded by Lea Sirk with "Hvala, ne!"
