= Billysi =

Pop rock music group from Slovenia

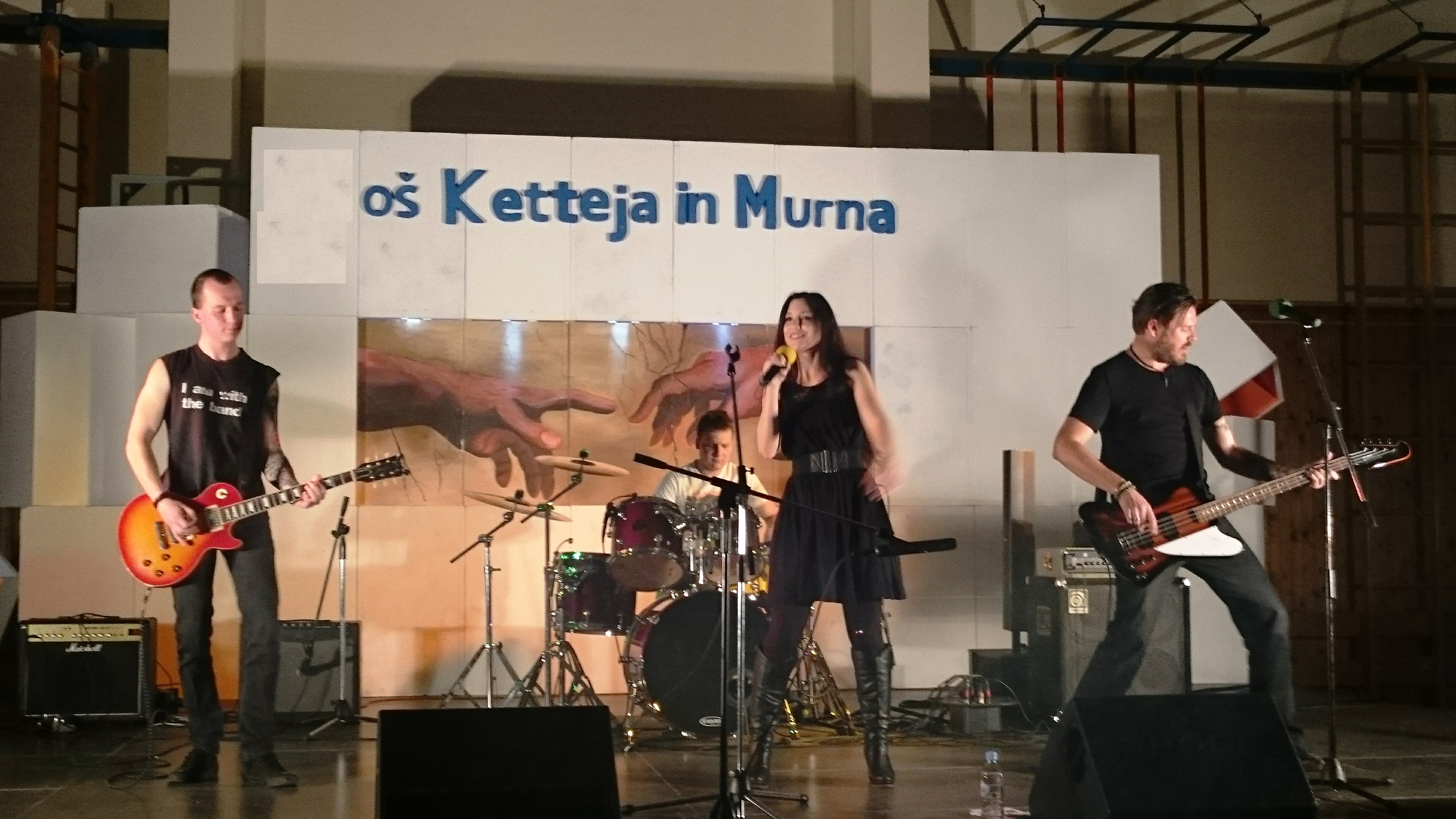
- Billysi in 2015

Background information
- Origin: Ljubljana, Slovenia
- Genres: Pop rock
- Years active: 2001–recent
- Label: Dallas Records
- Members: Urška Majdič (vocals) Sergej Pobegajlo (bass); Matic Ajdič (guitar) Jure Rozman (drums)
- Past members: Steffano Vrabec, Martin Rozman, Eki Lutman, Marko Soršak, Roman Ratej
- Website: http://www.billysi.net

Billysi is a pop rock music group from Slovenia. Before September 2007 they used a longer version of the name, Billy's Private Parking. The members write and produce all of their music.

== History ==
The band was founded in 2001 by Sergej Pobegajlo, an established songwriter, and member of Billysi. He has composed and worked with many notable musicians (Doug Fieger – The Knack, Yunk, Hannah, ...) while living in Hollywood, Los Angeles and has received a national best-songwriter award Zlati petelin in 2000.

The base for the band became Ljubljana, where he found the talents for the band and started to work with them. The first cast included Steffano Vrabec, the famous Italian drummer (Achtung Babies) and Urška Majdič (a.k.a. Ursyna), who is still the front-woman and co-composer for the band.

After a few changes in the cast they found the current guitarist, Matic Ajdič. There has been a change on the bass since the beginning – from Martin Rozman to Sergej Pobegajlo – and a series of changes on the drums, including Eki Lutman, Marko Soršak (Elvis Jackson), Roman Ratej (t.A.T.u.) to Jure Rozman (Da Phenomena), who stays with the band for the longest time.

Billysi used to be known as Billy's Private Parking. Since then it has established a name of a good-vibe rock band on live concerts, and has gained many radio-hits in this time (Brez besed, Neon, Ime, Hello Hello, etc.). It has won several awards, including national Diamanti award for Best in Rock (Feb 2009).

It is one of the most recognizable rock groups in Slovenia, with their upcoming 4th full-length studio album in English to reach as much listeners across the world as possible.

=== Breaking through ===
After their first record, Modra pravljica (2002), they were present on numerous national music charts with three of their songs.

BPP entered a pop-festival Melodije morja in sonca (2004) with a hard-rock song Še verjamem (I still believe) with which they got to the final of the contest.

BPP presented the song Preženi oblake on a famous Slovene festival Hit Festival in November 2004 and came out second, winning first place by radio juries all over Slovenia. Urška Majdič received a special award for the lyrics.

They decided to take a chance on EMA - the Slovenia's Eurovision song contest. This time they were even bolder - they wrote and recorded a rock song titled "Ljubljana" in only a day and got to the finals.

Their second album, Insomnia, was released in May 2005.

Four songs from the album reached the Top places of the national music charts, including:

- "Ljubljana", 1st place - Popevka tedna)
- "Ime", 1st place, Magazine Stop (Stop pops 20), 1st place Planet 10 national Mobitel chart (two weeks), 1st place Moj Radio, 1st place TV video chart A kanal.
- "Insomnia", 1st place - Val 202

Urška wrote and performed a song with cooperation of Blue Production Team for a TV commercial for the Slovenian mobile operator Si.mobil (Vodafone). It was a pop-house song in English "If I ... (Fell In love)", which became a hit in Slovenia. Urška, whose nickname in this project was Uršyna, got the SOF - OFF advertising reward for best song on the SOF festival in Portorož. Billysi remade the song in a rock version for their live performances.

=== Magia (2007) ===
Billysi released their third album Magia with Dallas Records in November 2007. The album got thumbs up reviews by top Slovene music magazines (24ur.com, Slovenske novice, Pilot, Playboy, Žurnal24, Rockonnet etc.). Magia is more pop-rock oriented, with two songs in English.

Billysi released a single "Hello Hello" from Magia. They premiered this song in a live TV show on National TV TVS1. It is the first video in the world filmed by mobile-phones during a live show on a national TV. Hello Hello has been also used for a SiMobil mobile phones promotional action in March 2008.

== Awards ==
- National music award Diamanti for BEST IN ROCK (Feb 09)
- National award Zlati Petelin - award for music writing (S.Pobegajlo),
- Lyrics award - Hit festival '04 (U.Majdic – "Prezeni Oblake"),
- Voted for one of top-rock-songs of the year -Stop magazine ("Ime")
- Golden award for best song in advertising Sof-Off ("IF I…Fell In Love")
- Numerous top positions on radio charts (Val 202, Ra MB, Planet 10, Slo Top 10,... )

== Discography ==
Their records have been so far published in Slovenia by the following order:

- Modra pravljica (2002)
- single Brez besed
- Insomnia (2005)
- single Neon
- single Ime
- Magia (2007)– Dallas Records (EMI)
- Bite Me (2010)

Songwriter: Sergej Pobegajlo
Lyrics, music co-writer: Urška Majdič
