= Slovenia in the Eurovision Song Contest 2016 =

- Eurovision Song Contest 2016
- Participating broadcaster: Radiotelevizija Slovenija (RTVSLO)
- Country: Slovenia
- Selection process: Evrovizijska Melodija 2016
- Selection date: 27 February 2016

Competing entry
- Song: "Blue and Red"
- Artist: ManuElla
- Songwriters: Marjan Hvala; Manuella Brečko; Leon Oblak

Placement
- Semi-final result: Failed to qualify (14th)

Participation chronology

Slovenia was represented at the Eurovision Song Contest 2016 with the song "Blue and Red". written by Marjan Hvala, Manuella Brečko, and Leon Oblak, and performed by Brečko herself under her artistic name ManuElla. The Slovene participating broadcaster, Radiotelevizija Slovenija (RTVSLO), organised the national final Evrovizijska Melodija 2016 in order to select its entry for the contest. Ten entries competed in the national final where the winner was selected over two rounds of voting. In the first round, the top two entries were selected by a three-member jury panel. In the second round, "Blue and Red" performed by ManuElla was selected as the winner entirely by a public televote.

Slovenia was drawn to compete in the second semi-final of the Eurovision Song Contest which took place on 12 May 2016. Performing during the show in position 11, "Blue and Red" was not announced among the top 10 entries of the second semi-final and therefore did not qualify to compete in the final. It was later revealed that Slovenia placed fourteenth out of the 18 participating countries in the semi-final with 57 points.

== Background ==
Prior to the 2016 contest, Radiotelevizija Slovenija (RTVSLO) had participated in the Eurovision Song Contest representing Slovenia twenty-one times since its first entry in 1993. Its highest placing in the contest, to this point, has been seventh place, achieved on two occasions: in 1995 with the song "Prisluhni mi" performed by Darja Švajger and in 2001 with the song "Energy" performed by Nuša Derenda. The country's only other top ten result was achieved in 1997 when Tanja Ribič performing "Zbudi se" placed tenth. Since the introduction of semi-finals to the format of the contest in 2004, Slovenia had thus far only managed to qualify to the final on four occasions. In 2015, "Here for You" performed by the duo Maraaya qualified to the final and placed fourteenth.

As part of its duties as participating broadcaster, RTVSLO organises the selection of its entry in the Eurovision Song Contest and broadcasts the event in the country. The broadcaster confirmed its participation in the 2016 contest on 14 September 2015. RTVSLO has traditionally selected its entry through a national final entitled Evrovizijska Melodija (EMA), which has been produced with variable formats. To this point, the broadcaster has only foregone the use of this national final in 2013 when the entry was internally selected. For 2016, the broadcaster opted to organise Evrovizijska Melodija 2016 (EMA 2016) to select its entry. The 2016 edition of EMA was part of RTVSLO's new music festival Dnevi Slovenske Zabavne Glasbe (DSZG), which consisted of three evenings: Poprock competition, Popevka competition and EMA 2016. The project aimed to aid in the development of Slovenian music.

== Before Eurovision ==
=== EMA 2016 ===
EMA 2016 was the 20th edition of the Slovenian national final format Evrovizijska Melodija (EMA), used by RTV Slovenija to select Slovenia's entry for the Eurovision Song Contest 2016. The competition took place at the RTV Slovenija Studio 1 in Ljubljana, hosted by Klemen Slakonja and was broadcast on TV SLO 1, Radio Val 202, Radio Koper, Radio Maribor and online via the broadcaster's RTV 4D platform. An online backstage broadcast at RTV Slovenija's official website also occurred concurrently with the competition, which was hosted by Nejc Šmit.

==== Format ====
Ten songs competed in a televised show where the winner was selected over two rounds of voting. In the first round, a three-member expert jury selected two finalists out of the ten competing songs to proceed to a superfinal. Each member of the expert jury assigned a score of 1 (lowest score) to 5 (highest score) to each song with the top two being determined by the songs that receive the highest overall scores when the jury votes are combined. Ties were broken by giving priority to the song(s) that achieved a higher number of top scores (5), which would be followed by each juror indicating their preferred song should a tie still have persisted. In the superfinal, public televoting exclusively determined the winner. In case of technical problems with the televote, the jury would have voted to determine the winner in a similar process as in the first round of the competition.

==== Competing entries ====
Artists and composers were able to submit their entries to the broadcaster between 19 November 2015 and 21 December 2015. 61 entries were received by the broadcaster during the submission period. An expert committee consisting of Alenka Godec (singer), Gaber Radojevič (musician, composer and music producer), Aleksander Radić (Head of the Slovenian delegation at the Eurovision Song Contest) and Jernej Vene (music editor for Radio Val 202) selected ten artists and songs for the competition from the received submissions. The competing artists were announced on 5 January 2016. Among the competing artists were former Slovenian Eurovision contestants Regina who represented Slovenia in 1996 and Nuša Derenda who represented Slovenia in 2001.

==== Final ====
EMA 2016 took place on 27 February 2016. In addition to the performances of the competing entries, 2015 Slovenian Eurovision entrants Maraaya and 2015 Slovenian Junior Eurovision entrant Lina Kuduzović performed as guests. The winner was selected over two rounds of voting. In the first round, a three-member jury panel selected two entries to proceed to the second round. The jury consisted of Raay (singer-songwriter and member of Maraaya), Darja Švajger (1995 and 1999 Slovenian Eurovision entrant) and Tomaž Mihelič–Marlenna (2002 Slovenian Eurovision entrant as member of Sestre). In the second round, a public televote selected "Blue and Red" performed by ManuElla as the winner.

Final – 27 February 2016
R/O	Artist	Song	Songwriter(s)	Result
1	Anja Baš	"What If"	Anja Baš	—N/a
2	Žan Serčič	"Summer Story"	Žan Serčič	—N/a
3	Anja Kotar	"Too Cool"	Anja Kotar	—N/a
4	San Di Ego	"Brez tebe"	Nino Ošlak, Igor Pirkovič	—N/a
5	D Base	"Spet živ"	Alex Volasko, David Domjanič, Nejc Žehelj, Benjamin Dolić	—N/a
6	Regina	"Alive in Every Way"	Aleksander Kogoj, Jon Dobrun	—N/a
7	ManuElla	"Blue and Red"	Marjan Hvala, Manuella Brečko, Leon Oblak	Advanced
8	Raiven	"Črno bel"	Tadej Košir, Jernej Kržič, Sara Briški Cirman	Advanced
9	Nuša Derenda	"Tip Top"	Žiga Pirnat, Andraž Gliha	—N/a
10	Sebastijan Lukovnjak	"Tales of Tomorrow"	Martin Bezjak, Tadej Jambrovič	—N/a

Superfinal – 27 February 2016
R/O	Artist	Song	Televote	Place
1	ManuElla	"Blue and Red"	3,865	1
2	Raiven	"Črno bel"	3,738	2

=== Preparation ===
Following ManuElla's win at EMA 2016, the singer revealed that "Blue and Red" would likely undergo minor changes to produce the final Eurovision Song Contest version of the song. On 4 April, the new version of "Blue and Red" was released to the public. In late April, a mobile app was launched that allowed users to access exclusive content and follow ManuElla's preparations for the contest. On 30 April, ManuElla released the official music video for "Blue and Red", which was directed by Darko Drinovac.

=== Promotion ===
ManuElla made several appearances across Europe to specifically promote "Blue and Red" as the Slovenian Eurovision entry. On 9 April, ManuElla performed during the Eurovision in Concert event which was held at the Melkweg venue in Amsterdam, Netherlands and hosted by Cornald Maas and Hera Björk. Between 11 and 13 April, ManuElla took part in promotional activities in Tel Aviv, Israel and performed during the Israel Calling event held at the Ha'teatron venue.

== At Eurovision ==
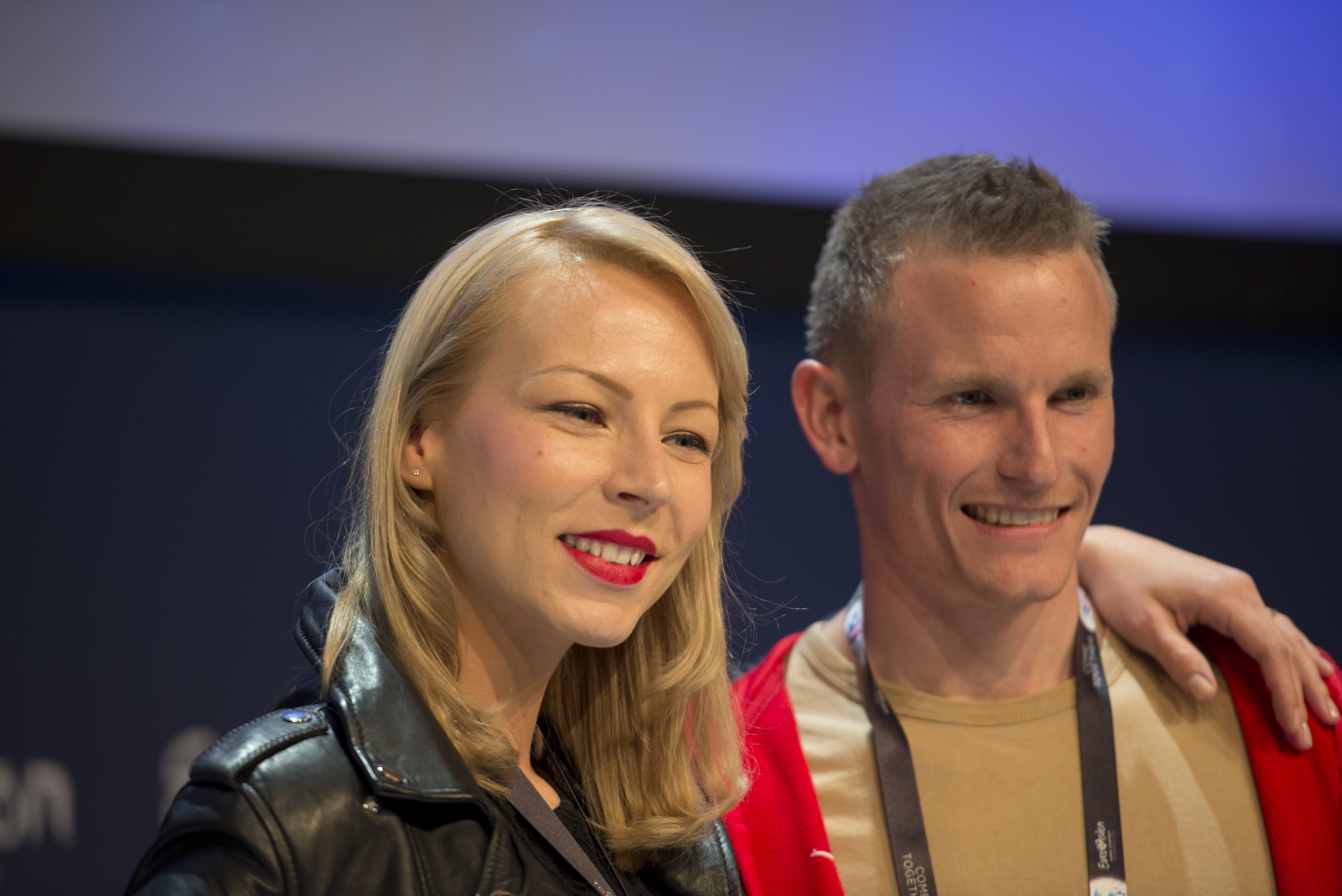
ManuElla and acrobat Jannik Baltzer Hattel during a press meet and greet

According to Eurovision rules, all nations with the exceptions of the host country and the "Big Five" (France, Germany, Italy, Spain and the United Kingdom) are required to qualify from one of two semi-finals in order to compete for the final; the top ten countries from each semi-final progress to the final. The European Broadcasting Union (EBU) split up the competing countries into six different pots based on voting patterns from previous contests, with countries with favourable voting histories put into the same pot. On 25 January 2016, a special allocation draw was held which placed each country into one of the two semi-finals, as well as which half of the show they would perform in. Slovenia was placed into the second semi-final, to be held on 12 May 2016, and was scheduled to perform in the second half of the show.

Once all the competing songs for the 2016 contest had been released, the running order for the semi-finals was decided by the shows' producers rather than through another draw, so that similar songs were not placed next to each other. Originally, Slovenia was set to perform in position 11, following the entry from Australia and before the entry from Romania. However, following Romania's disqualification from the contest on 22 April and subsequent removal from the running order of the second semi-final, Slovenia's performing position remained at 11 and the nation would now perform before the entry from Bulgaria.

In Slovenia, the semi-finals were televised on TV SLO 2 and the final was televised on TV SLO 1 with commentary by Andrej Hofer. The contest was also broadcast via radio with the second semi-final and final airing on Radio Val 202 and all three shows airing on Radio Maribor. The Slovenian spokesperson, who announced the top 12-point score awarded by the Slovenian jury during the final, was Marjetka Vovk, who represented Slovenia in the Eurovision Song Contest 2015 as member of Maraaya.

=== Semi-final ===
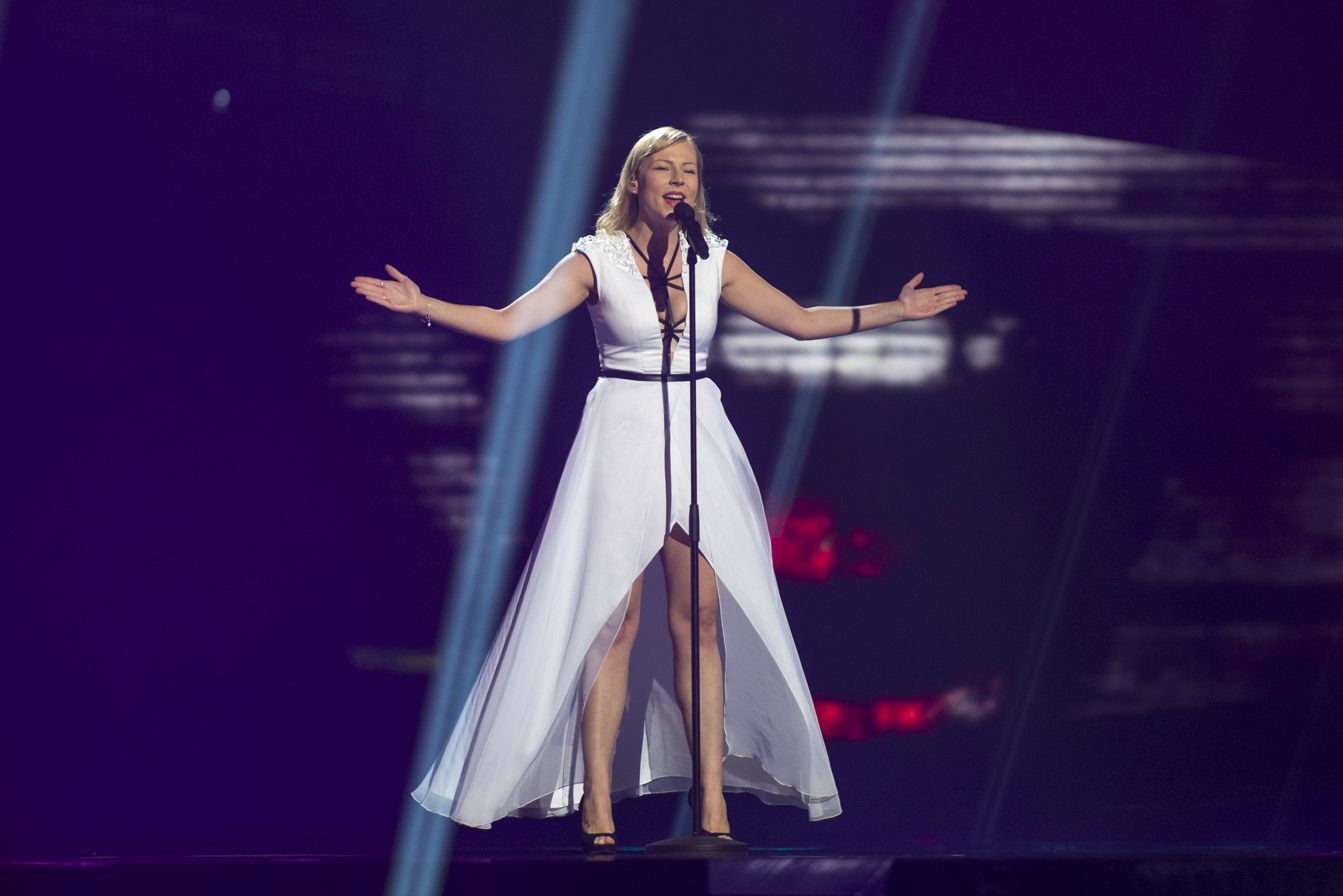
ManuElla during a rehearsal before the second semi-final

ManuElla took in technical rehearsals on 5 and 7 May, followed by dress rehearsals on 11 and 12 May. This included the jury show on 11 May where the professional juries of each country watched and voted on the competing entries.

The Slovenian performance featured ManuElla performing in a long white dress, joined by an acrobat on stage who performed spins on a pole. The stage colours were blue and red and the LED screens displayed images of ManuElla's face miming the lyrics of the song. The performance also featured the use of a wind machine and fountain pyrotechnic effects. The Slovenian performance was choreographed by Anže Škrube. ManuElla was joined by four off-stage backing vocalists: Karin Zemljič, Lea Sirk, Mitja Bobič and the co-composer of "Blue and Red" Marjan Hvala. The acrobat featured during the performance was Jannik Baltzer Hattel from the Danish acrobatic trio No Limits.

At the end of the show, Slovenia was not announced among the top 10 entries in the second semi-final and therefore failed to qualify to compete in the final. It was later revealed that Slovenia placed fourteenth in the semi-final, receiving a total of 57 points: 8 points from the televoting and 49 points from the juries.

=== Voting ===
Voting during the three shows was conducted under a new system that involved each country now awarding two sets of points from 1–8, 10 and 12: one from their professional jury and the other from televoting. Each nation's jury consisted of five music industry professionals who are citizens of the country they represent, with their names published before the contest to ensure transparency. This jury judged each entry based on: vocal capacity; the stage performance; the song's composition and originality; and the overall impression by the act. In addition, no member of a national jury was permitted to be related in any way to any of the competing acts in such a way that they cannot vote impartially and independently. The individual rankings of each jury member as well as the nation's televoting results were released shortly after the grand final.

Below is a breakdown of points awarded to Slovenia and awarded by Slovenia in the second semi-final and grand final of the contest, and the breakdown of the jury voting and televoting conducted during the two shows:

==== Points awarded to Slovenia ====
Points awarded to Slovenia (Semi-final 2)
Score	Televote	Jury
12 points		
10 points		
8 points		Ireland
7 points		Belgium; Macedonia
6 points		Albania; Italy; Serbia
5 points		
4 points	Serbia	Australia
3 points	Macedonia	Latvia
2 points		
1 point	Albania	Bulgaria; Lithuania

==== Points awarded by Slovenia ====
Points awarded by Slovenia (Semi-final 2)
Score	Televote	Jury
12 points	Serbia	Belgium
10 points	Macedonia	Latvia
8 points	Ukraine	Ukraine
7 points	Belgium	Switzerland
6 points	Australia	Bulgaria
5 points	Bulgaria	Australia
4 points	Poland	Israel
3 points	Albania	Poland
2 points	Norway	Belarus
1 point	Georgia	Lithuania

Points awarded by Slovenia (Final)
Score	Televote	Jury
12 points	Serbia	Ukraine
10 points	Russia	Bulgaria
8 points	Croatia	Belgium
7 points	Ukraine	Latvia
6 points	Austria	Australia
5 points	Sweden	Serbia
4 points	Poland	Armenia
3 points	Australia	Hungary
2 points	Bulgaria	Israel
1 point	Italy	Netherlands

==== Detailed voting results ====
The following members comprised the Slovene jury:

- Marjetka Vovk (jury chairperson) – singer, vocal coach, songwriter, represented Slovenia in the 2015 contest as member of Maraaya
- Eva Hren – singer, guitar player
- Tadej Košir – guitar player, composer, producer
- Klemen Mramor (Clemens) – singer, composer, lyricist
- Urša Vlašić – lyricist, lyricist of the 1998, 2005, 2006 and 2011 Slovenian contest entries "Naj bogovi slišijo", "Stop", "Mr Nobody" and "No One"

Detailed voting results from Slovenia (Semi-final 2)
R/O	Country	Jury							Televote	
R/O	Country	M. Vovk	E. Hren	T. Košir	Clemens	U. Vlašić	Rank	Points	Rank	Points
01	Latvia	1	4	6	4	6	2	10	12	
02	Poland	5	6	14	11	1	8	3	7	4
03	Switzerland	2	11	4	8	5	4	7	17	
04	Israel	7	7	12	5	4	7	4	15	
05	Belarus	13	10	10	6	2	9	2	16	
06	Serbia	11	8	7	7	12	11		1	12
07	Ireland	15	14	5	13	13	13		11	
08	Macedonia	16	13	17	14	14	16		2	10
09	Lithuania	10	12	11	9	3	10	1	14	
10	Australia	9	9	3	3	10	6	5	5	6
11	Slovenia									
12	Bulgaria	4	5	13	2	9	5	6	6	5
13	Denmark	17	16	16	15	15	17		13	
14	Ukraine	8	1	1	10	7	3	8	3	8
15	Norway	12	15	9	12	16	14		9	2
16	Georgia	14	3	8	17	17	12		10	1
17	Albania	6	17	15	16	11	15		8	3
18	Belgium	3	2	2	1	8	1	12	4	7

Detailed voting results from Slovenia (Final)
R/O	Country	Jury							Televote	
R/O	Country	M. Vovk	E. Hren	T. Košir	Clemens	U. Vlašić	Rank	Points	Rank	Points
01	Belgium	7	3	2	3	10	3	8	11	
02	Czech Republic	26	22	16	18	17	22		26	
03	Netherlands	18	13	7	12	9	10	1	16	
04	Azerbaijan	24	24	22	25	19	25		25	
05	Hungary	4	4	18	13	11	8	3	14	
06	Italy	15	15	26	19	25	23		10	1
07	Israel	19	12	14	5	7	9	2	20	
08	Bulgaria	2	2	11	1	6	2	10	9	2
09	Sweden	21	11	10	10	15	15		6	5
10	Germany	25	26	20	26	18	26		23	
11	France	5	5	15	17	22	13		12	
12	Poland	20	25	25	20	2	19		7	4
13	Australia	10	7	4	2	14	5	6	8	3
14	Cyprus	6	18	23	7	5	11		17	
15	Serbia	12	8	6	9	12	6	5	1	12
16	Lithuania	11	21	9	24	4	16		13	
17	Croatia	9	14	12	14	13	12		3	8
18	Russia	17	19	24	16	1	17		2	10
19	Spain	23	20	13	11	24	18		18	
20	Latvia	1	9	5	4	8	4	7	15	
21	Ukraine	3	1	1	6	3	1	12	4	7
22	Malta	14	23	19	21	23	24		24	
23	Georgia	8	10	8	15	26	14		21	
24	Austria	13	16	21	23	21	20		5	6
25	United Kingdom	22	17	17	22	20	21		22	
26	Armenia	16	6	3	8	16	7	4	19	
