= Salvation (ManuElla song) =

Single by ManuElla
- Released: February 24, 2017
- Genre: Country pop
- Length: 2:45
- Songwriter(s): Maja Keuc; Marjan Hvala; Manuella Brečko

ManuElla singles chronology
"Blue and Red" (2016)	"Salvation" (2017)	"The Sound" (2018)

Live performance
- "Salvation 2017 EMA" on YouTube

"Salvation" is a song recorded by Slovenian singer-songwriter ManuElla and the follow-up to her Eurovision Song Contest entry "Blue and Red". It was written by Maja Keuc, Marjan Hvala and Manuella Brečko. The track was released on February 24, 2017, as a stand-alone single, and was performed for the first time at EMA 2017, in which ManuElla had a guest slot. Backed by an instrumentation of guitars and drums, the country-pop track has feel-good and inspirational lyrics.

== Commercial performance ==
Although the song didn't impact any official chart, 'Salvation' performed well on streaming services, especially Spotify. Due to its high streams, the song is currently the highest streamed non-Eurovision single by a Slovenian solo artist.

== Critical reception ==
The track received generally favourable reviews from critics. Wiwibloggs described the song as 'refreshing and current' and that it sounds like a continuation of her previous single "Blue and Red". Eurovision Australia expressed their fondness of the track and called it 'energetic' and ManuElla's vocals were complemented.
