= Hvala, ne! =

2018 song by Lea Sirk

Single by Lea Sirk

from the album 2018
- Released: 2 March 2018
- Genre: Trap; Wonky; Pop rap
- Length: 3:00
- Label: Self-released
- Songwriters: Lea Sirk; Tomy DeClerque
- Producers: Lea Sirk; Tomy DeClerque

Lea Sirk singles chronology
"Back to Being Me" (2018)	"Hvala, ne!" (2018)	"Moj profil" (2018)

Music video
- "Hvala, ne!" on YouTube

Eurovision Song Contest 2018 entry
- Country: Slovenia
- Artist: Lea Sirk
- Language: Slovene
- Composers: Lea Sirk; Tomy DeClerque
- Lyricist: Lea Sirk

Finals performance
- Semi-final result: 8th
- Semi-final points: 132
- Final result: 22nd
- Final points: 64

Entry chronology
- ◄ "On My Way" (2017)
- "Sebi" (2019) ►

"Hvala, ne!" (transl. No, Thanks!) is a song performed by Slovenian singer Lea Sirk. The song was released as a digital download on 2 March 2018. The song was written and produced by Lea Sirk and Tomy DeClerque.

== Eurovision Song Contest ==
The song represented Slovenia in the Eurovision Song Contest 2018 in Lisbon, Portugal. The song competed in the second semi-final, held on 10 May 2018, and qualified for the final.

== Music video ==
Official music video directed by Perica Rai was released on 25 April 2018. It was produced by Mediaspot videos and financially supported by SAZAS. Ylenia Mahnič in Tine Ugrin starring in main roles.

== Track listing ==
Digital download
No.	Title	Length
1.	"Hvala, ne!"	3:00

== Credits and personnel ==
- Lea Sirk – music, lyrics, arrangement, production
- Tomy DeClerque – music, arrangement, production

== Charts ==
=== Weekly charts ===
Chart (2018)	Peak position
Slovenia (SloTop50)	9

== Release history ==
Region	Date	Format	Label
Various	2 March 2018	Digital download	Self-released
Official video	25 April 2018	Music video	Mediaspot videos
