= Manu (singer) =

Slovenian singer

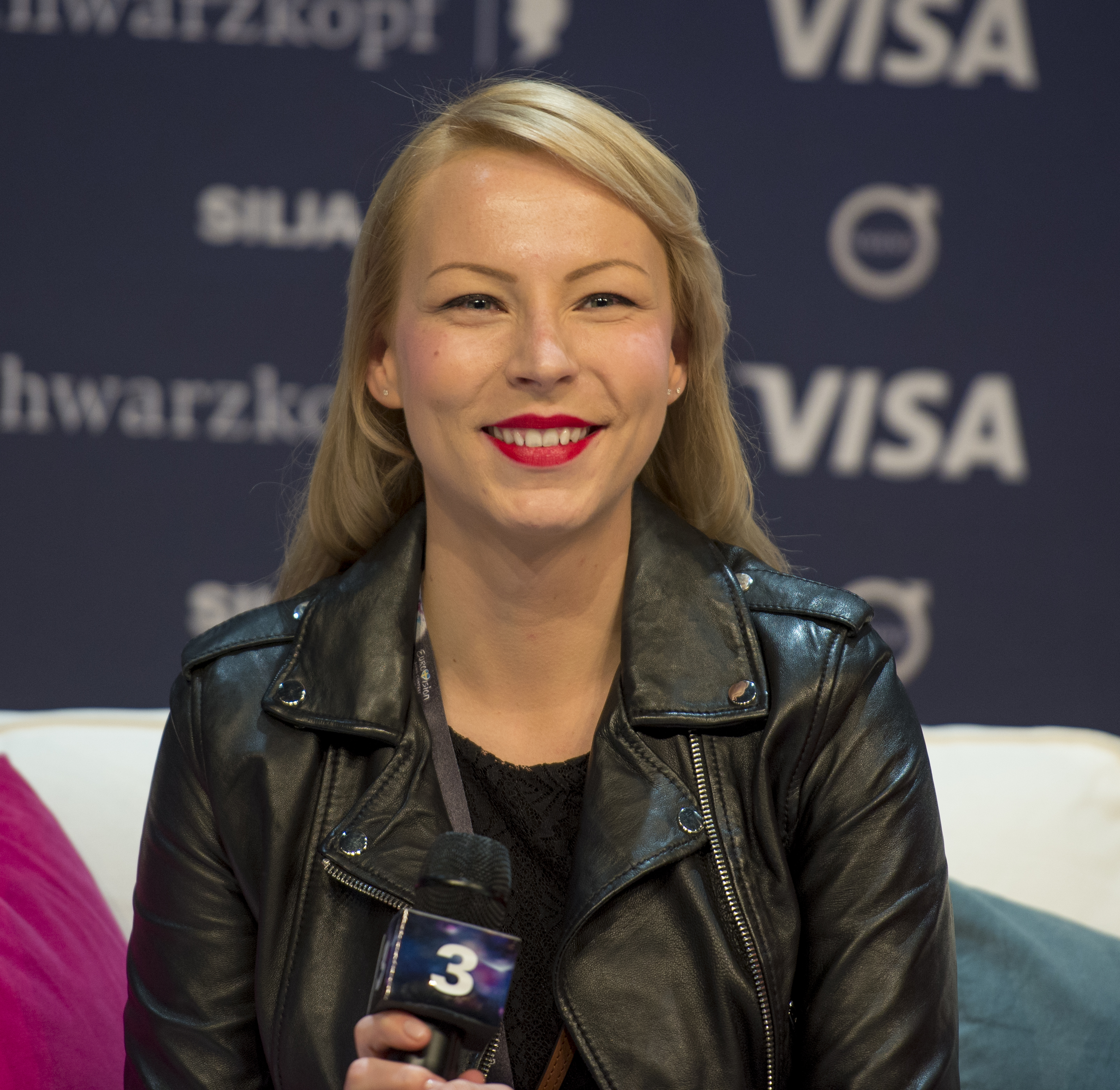
- Manu in 2016

Background information
- Born: Manuella Brečko; 31 January 1989 (age 37); Celje, SR Slovenia, SFR Yugoslavia
- Genre: Pop • Pop-rock • Country-pop
- Occupations: Singer; songwriter; music producer
- Instruments: Vocals; bass-guitar; accordion piano; guitar
- Years active: 2011–present

Manuella Brečko (born 31 January 1989), better known as Manu, and formerly known as ManuElla, is a Slovenian singer, songwriter and music producer. She represented Slovenia in the Eurovision Song Contest 2016 with the song "Blue and Red.

== Life and career ==
Manuella was born in Celje, present day Slovenia. At the age of 6, she started to play accordion, with 9, piano and with the age of 12, she started to play bass-guitar and formed a band. At the age of 16, she performed on the National television in the second season of Bitka talentov. In 2011 she competed in Misija Evrovizija and placed in the Semi-final.

In 2012, Brečko graduated from music production at the University of Electrical Engineering, Ljubljana.

On 5 January 2016, she was announced as one of the ten competing artists in EMA 2016, with the song "Blue and Red". In the final, held on 27 February, she was declared the winner.

Brečko represented Slovenia at the Eurovision Song Contest 2016 performing during the second semi-final held on 12 May 2016 in Stockholm, Sweden.

In December 2016, she moved to Stockholm, to forge an international career. In 2017, Manu released her comeback single 'Salvation' which garnered attention on streaming services and became the highest streamed non-Eurovision single by a Slovenian solo artist. In early 2018, it was revealed Manu would re-enter EMA with the song 'The Sound'.

Manu's third single since her Eurovision participation, 'Only Love', was released in April 2020, serving as the lead single from her upcoming album 'Sunrise'. The second single, 'Forever Flow', was released in July 2020.

== Discography ==
=== Singles ===
Title	Year	Peak chart positions	Album
Title	Year	SLO	Album
"Il futuro"	2013	—	
"V tvojem ognju (Inferno)"	2013	—	
"Zadnji ples"	2013	—	
"Barve"	2013	—	
"Silent Night"	2014	—	
"Blue and Red"	2016	1	
"Salvation"	2017	—	
"The Sound"	2018	—	
"Only Love"	2020	—	Sunrise
"Forever Flow"	2020	—	Sunrise
"—" denotes a single that did not chart or was not released.

Preceded by Maraaya with "Here for You"	Slovenia in the Eurovision Song Contest; 2016	Succeeded by Omar Naber with "On My Way"
