= On My Way (Omar Naber song) =

2017 song by Omar Naber

Single by Omar Naber
- Released: 8 April 2017
- Genre: Pop
- Length: 3:00
- Label: Universal Music
- Songwriter: Omar Naber
- Producer: Omar Naber

Omar Naber singles chronology
"Ne zapusti me" (2017)	"On My Way" (2017)

Eurovision Song Contest 2017 entry
- Country: Slovenia
- Artist: Omar Naber
- Language: English
- Composer: Omar Naber
- Lyricist: Omar Naber

Finals performance
- Semi-final result: 17th
- Semi-final points: 36

Entry chronology
- ◄ "Blue and Red" (2016)
- "Hvala, ne!" (2018) ►

"On My Way" is a song performed by Slovenian singer and songwriter Omar Naber. It represented Slovenia in the Eurovision Song Contest 2017. Naber previously represented Slovenia in 2005, which coincidentally also took place in Kyiv, like the 2017 song contest; he performed the song "Stop", which failed to qualify for the final. The song was released as a digital download on 8 April 2017 by Universal Music. The song peaked at number 12 in Slovenia.

== Eurovision Song Contest ==
Omar Naber was announced to be competing in EMA 2017, Slovenia's national selection for the Eurovision Song Contest 2017, on 4 December 2016. Naber competed in the first semi-final on 17 February 2017, he advanced to the final which took place on 24 February 2017, where he won the jury vote and finished second in the public vote, being declared the winner. He represented Slovenia in the Eurovision Song Contest in Kyiv, Ukraine at the International Exhibition Centre. Slovenia competed in the second half of the first semi-final at the Eurovision Song Contest on 9 May 2017. Slovenia placed 17th in the semifinal with 36 points failing to Qualify.

== Music video ==
A music video to accompany the release of "On My Way" was first released onto YouTube on 2 April 2017 at a total length of three minutes and thirty-five seconds.

== Track listing ==
Digital download
No.	Title	Length
1.	"On My Way"	3:00

== Charts ==
Chart (2017)	Peak position
Slovenia (SloTop50)	12

== Release history ==
Region	Date	Format	Label
Various	2 April 2017	Music video	—N/a
Various	8 April 2017	Digital download	Universal Music
