= Blue and Red =

2016 single by ManuElla

Single by ManuElla
- Released: 2016
- Recorded: 2016
- Genre: Country pop
- Composers: Manuella Brečko; Marjan Hvala
- Lyricist: Leon Oblak

ManuElla singles chronology
"Silent Night" (2014)	"Blue and Red" (2016)	"Salvation" (2017)

Eurovision Song Contest 2016 entry
- Country: Slovenia
- Artist: ManuElla
- Languages: English, Slovenian
- Composers: Manuella Brečko; Marjan Hvala
- Lyricist: Leon Oblak

Finals performance
- Semi-final result: 14th
- Semi-final points: 57

Entry chronology
- ◄ "Here for You" (2015)
- "On My Way" (2017) ►

"Blue and Red" is a song performed by Slovenian singer ManuElla. The song represented Slovenia in the Eurovision Song Contest 2016. ManuElla performed it in the second semi-final on May 12, 2016.

== Chart performance ==
=== Weekly charts ===
Chart (2016)	Peak position
Slovenia (SloTop50)	1

=== Year-end charts ===
Chart (2016)	Peak position
Slovenia (SloTop50)	39
