= Lea Sirk =

Slovenian singer (born 1989)

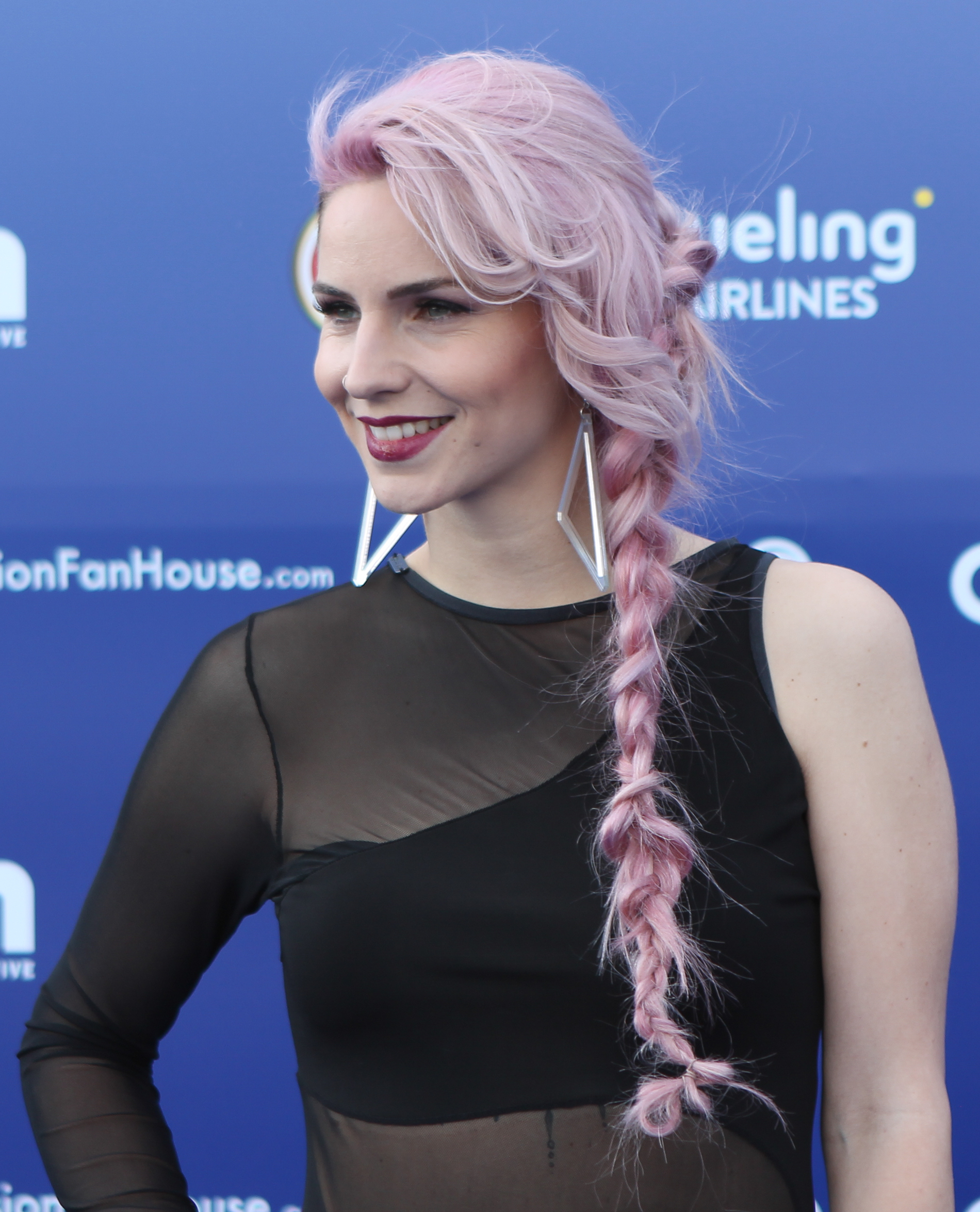
- Sirk in 2018

Background information
- Born: 1 September 1989 (age 36); Koper, SR Slovenia, SFR Yugoslavia
- Genres: Pop
- Occupations: Singer; songwriter
- Years active: 2006–present

Lea Sirk (born 1 September 1989) is a Slovenian singer, who represented her country in the Eurovision Song Contest in 2018.

== Biography ==
She started her musical education at the age of five in Koper, Slovenia. Between 2001 and 2007, Lea participated at numerous national and international competitions, where she regularly finished amongst the top positions. Lea finished her secondary school while studying the concert flute.

Lea studied at the Conservatory of Music in Geneva and has played in various orchestras and participated in different seminars across Europe. Lea Sirk completed her undergraduate studies early and with honours. She also finished her master studies with honours two years later and became a Master of Arts in Specialised Music Performance.

During her studies, Lea Sirk also established herself as a singer. In 2005, Lea received the award for the most promising young singer at the International Music Competition Cologne.

She began participating regularly at various festivals, as well as EMA, the Slovenian national selection for the Eurovision Song Contest (2009, 2010). Her participation in the show Znan obraz ima svoj glas (Your Face Sounds Familiar) left an indelible mark on viewers, as Lea was the most convincing through her transformations into famous world performers, including the 2017 Eurovision Song Contest winner, Salvador Sobral.

As a backing vocalist, Lea already performed already at the Eurovision Song Contest, namely in 2014 in Copenhagen with Tinkara Kovač. Lea is also a studio musician and music arranger and has performed on numerous grand stages and recorded with numerous Slovene musicians.

Lea, a mother of two girls, has been building her solo singing career in parallel with her other responsibilities. She won at EMA 2018 where she became the Slovene representative at the 2018 Eurovision Song Contest with her song "Hvala, ne!", which she wrote alongside Tomy DeClerque.

In April 2023, Lea was revealed as singer of the English version of "Interstellar Journey", the official release theme song of the game Honkai: Star Rail.

== Discography ==
=== Albums ===
| Title | Details | Peak chart positions |
| Title | Details | SLO |
|---|---|---|
| Roža | Released: 2014; Formats: CD, digital download | — |
| 2018 | Released: 28 November 2018; Format: digital download | — |

=== Singles ===
| Title | Year | Peak chart positions | Album |
| Title | Year | SLO | Album |
|---|---|---|---|
| "Povej mi, kdaj" | 2007 | — | Non-album singles |
| "Kaj bi rad" | 2009 | — | Non-album singles |
| "Znamenje iz sanj" | 2009 | — | Non-album singles |
| "Vampir je moj poet" | 2010 | — | Non-album singles |
| "Vse je le "a"" | 2010 | — | Non-album singles |
| "A bi? Ti bi!" | 2012 | — | Roža |
| "Song 6" | 2012 | — | Non-album single |
| "Čudovit je svet" | 2012 | — | 2018 |
| "Ura je 8" | 2013 | — | Roža |
| "Tako je" | 2014 | — | Roža |
| "Freedom" | 2017 | — | 2018 |
| "Back To Being Me" | 2018 | — | 2018 |
| "Hvala, ne!" | 2018 | 9 | 2018 |
| "Moj Profil" | 2018 | — | 2018 |
| "Recept Za Lajf" | 2018 | — | 2018 |
| "My Moon" | 2019 | — | |
| "2018" | 2019 | — | |
| "Po Svoje" | 2019 | — | |
| "V Dvoje" | 2019 | — | |
| "V Krogu" | 2020 | — | |
| "Always You" | 2021 | — | |
| "Zgodba za Dva" | 2021 | — | |
| "Ne bom je peljal ven!" | 2022 | 65 | "Ogenj te ne bo zapustil" |

| Preceded by Omar Naber with "On My Way" | Slovenia in the Eurovision Song Contest; 2018 | Succeeded by Zala Kralj & Gašper Šantl with "Sebi" |
