= Slovenia in the Eurovision Song Contest 2005 =

- Eurovision Song Contest 2005
- Participating broadcaster: Radiotelevizija Slovenija (RTVSLO)
- Country: Slovenia
- Selection process: Evrovizijska Melodija 2005
- Selection date: 6 February 2005

Competing entry
- Song: "Stop"
- Artist: Omar Naber
- Songwriters: Omar Naber; Urša Vlašič

Placement
- Semi-final result: Failed to qualify (12th)

Participation chronology

Slovenia was represented at the Eurovision Song Contest 2005 with the song "Stop", written by Omar Naber and Urša Vlašič, and performed by Naber himself. The Slovene participating broadcaster, Radiotelevizija Slovenija (RTVSLO), organised the national final Evrovizijska Melodija 2005 in order to select its entry for the contest. Fourteen entries competed in the national final where the winner was selected over two rounds of public televoting. In the first round, the top three entries were selected. In the second round, "Stop" performed by Omar Naber was selected as the winner.

Slovenia competed in the semi-final of the Eurovision Song Contest which took place on 19 May 2005. Performing during the show in position 23, "Stop" was not announced among the top 10 entries of the semi-final and therefore did not qualify to compete in the final. It was later revealed that Slovenia placed twelfth out of the 25 participating countries in the semi-final with 69 points.

== Background ==
Prior to the 2005 contest, Radiotelevizija Slovenija (RTVSLO) had participated in the Eurovision Song Contest representing Slovenia ten times since its first entry in 1993. Its highest placing in the contest, to this point, has been seventh place, achieved on two occasions: in 1995 with the song "Prisluhni mi" performed by Darja Švajger, and in 2001 with the song "Energy" performed by Nuša Derenda. Its only other top ten result was achieved in 1997 when "Zbudi se" performed by Tanja Ribič placed tenth. In 2004, "Stay Forever" performed by Platin failed to qualify to the final.

As part of its duties as participating broadcaster, RTVSLO organises the selection of its entry in the Eurovision Song Contest and broadcasts the event in the country. The broadcaster confirmed its participation in the 2005 contest on 4 August 2004. The broadcaster has traditionally selected its entry through a national final entitled Evrovizijska Melodija (EMA), which has been produced with variable formats. For 2005, RTVSLO opted to organise Evrovizijska Melodija 2005 (EMA 2005) to select its entry.

== Before Eurovision ==
=== Evrovizijska Melodija 2005 ===
Evrovizijska Melodija 2005 (EMA 2005) was the 10th edition of the Slovenian national final format Evrovizijska Melodija (EMA), used by RTVSLO to select its entry for the Eurovision Song Contest 2005. The competition took place at the RTVSLO Studio 1 in Ljubljana, hosted by Saša Einsiedler and Saša Gerdej and was broadcast on TV SLO1, Radio Val 202, Radio Koper, Radio Maribor, and online via the broadcaster's website rtvslo.si.

==== Competing entries ====
Artists and composers were able to submit their entries to the broadcaster between 16 October 2004 and 10 December 2004. 103 entries were received by the broadcaster during the submission period. An expert committee consisting of Andrej Karoli (music editor for Radia Slovenija), Mario Galunič (television presenter), Zoran Predin (singer-songwriter), Andrej Šifrer (singer and composer), Jaka Pucihar (composer) and Matjaž Kosi (songwriter and music producer) selected thirteen artists and songs for the competition from the received submissions, while an additional entry was provided by Omar Naber who won the first season of the talent show Bitka Talentov. The competing artists were announced on 22 December 2004. Among the competing artists were Regina (who represented Slovenia in 1996) and Nuša Derenda (who represented Slovenia in 2001).

==== Final ====
EMA 2005 took place on 6 February 2005. In addition to the performances of the competing entries, Ruslana (who won Eurovision for Ukraine in 2004) and Željko Joksimović (who represented Serbia and Montenegro in 2004) performed as guests. The winner was selected over two rounds of public televoting. In the first round, three entries were selected to proceed to the second round. In the second round, "Stop" performed by Omar Naber was selected as the winner.

Final – 6 February 2005
R/O	Artist	Song	Songwriter(s)	Televote	Place
1	Johnny Bravo	"Večni otrok"	Leon Oblak	3,049	7
2	Express	"Skozi mesto"	Olja Dešić, Vlado Poredoš	2,370	11
3	Victory	"Daleč od oči"	Martin Štibernik, Drago Mislej	724	14
4	Saša Lendero	"Metulj"	Andrej Babić, Saša Lendero	24,030	2
5	Omar Naber	"Stop"	Omar Naber, Urša Vlašič	23,873	3
6	Jadranka Juras	"Anima"	Jadranka Juras, Jani Hace, Darko Nikolovski	2,829	8
7	Anika Horvat	"Kje si"	Marino Legovič, Damjana Kenda Hussu	1,927	12
8	Sergeja	"Nedotaknjena"	Franci Zabukovec, Darja Pristovnik	1,148	13
9	Regina	"Proti vetru"	Damjan Pančur, Aleksander Kogoj, Feri Lainšček	2,514	9
10	Nude	"Tako lepo si mi zlomila srce"	Gaber Marolt, Boštjan Dermol, Teodor Amanović	4,401	6
11	Billy's Private Parking	"Ljubljana"	Sergej Pobegajlo, Urška Majdič	2,394	10
12	Alya	"Exxtra"	Bor Zuljan, Alja Omladič, Žare Pak, Cvetka Omladič	11,364	5
13	Rebeka Dremelj	"Pojdi z menoj"	Aleš Klinar, Anja Rupel	25,739	1
14	Nuša Derenda	"Noe, Noe"	Matjaž Vlašič, Urša Vlašič	19,090	4

Superfinal – 6 February 2005
R/O	Artist	Song	Televote	Place
1	Saša Lendero	"Metulj"	27,825	2
2	Omar Naber	"Stop"	29,945	1
3	Rebeka Dremelj	"Pojdi z menoj"	23,514	3

== At Eurovision ==
The Eurovision Song Contest 2005 took place at the Palace of Sports in Kyiv, Ukraine and consisted of one semi-final on 19 May, and the final on 21 May 2005. According to Eurovision rules, all nations with the exceptions of the host country, the "Big Four" (France, Germany, Spain and the United Kingdom), and the ten highest placed finishers in the 2004 contest were required to qualify from the semi-final in order to compete for the final; the top ten countries from the semi-final progressed to the final. As Slovenia had placed 21st in the previous contest, the nation had to compete in the semi-final this year. On 22 March 2005, an allocation draw was held which determined the running order for the semi-final and Slovenia was set to perform in position 23, following the entry from Ireland and before the entry from Denmark. At the end of the show, Slovenia was not announced among the top 10 entries in the semi-final and therefore failed to qualify to compete in the final. It was later revealed that Slovenia placed 12th in the semi-final, receiving a total of 69 points.

In Slovenia, the semi-final was televised on TV SLO2 and the final was televised on TV SLO1. Both shows featured commentary by Mojca Mavec. The two shows were also broadcast via radio on Radio Val 202 with commentary by Jernej Vene. RTVSLO appointed Katarina Čas as its spokesperson to announce the Slovenian votes during the final.

=== Voting ===
Below is a breakdown of points awarded to Slovenia and awarded by Slovenia in the semi-final and grand final of the contest. The nation awarded its 12 points to Croatia in the semi-final and the final of the contest.

==== Points awarded to Slovenia ====
Points awarded to Slovenia (Semi-final)
Score	Country
12 points	
10 points	Croatia
8 points	Albania; Bosnia and Herzegovina
7 points	Finland; Macedonia; Serbia and Montenegro
6 points	Russia
5 points	
4 points	Monaco
3 points	Austria; Ukraine
2 points	Belarus; Hungary
1 point	Iceland; Israel

==== Points awarded by Slovenia ====
Points awarded by Slovenia (Semi-final)
Score	Country
12 points	Croatia
10 points	Austria
8 points	Macedonia
7 points	Moldova
6 points	Latvia
5 points	Switzerland
4 points	Hungary
3 points	Norway
2 points	Estonia
1 point	Romania

Points awarded by Slovenia (Final)
Score	Country
12 points	Croatia
10 points	Serbia and Montenegro
8 points	Bosnia and Herzegovina
7 points	Latvia
6 points	Switzerland
5 points	Macedonia
4 points	Norway
3 points	Moldova
2 points	Greece
1 point	Malta
