= Radio Val 202 =

Slovenian public radio station

Val 202
- Type: Radio
- Country: Slovenia
- First air date: June 16, 1972
- Availability: Slovenia (nationwide), Austria, Croatia, Italy, Hungary (partial)
- Founded: Ljubljana
- Area: Slovenia
- Owner: Radiotelevizija Slovenija
- Key people: Andrej Karoli
- Digital channels: DVB-S2: Eutelsat 16A: 11.471 GHz; DAB+: 215.072 MHz (block 10D); DVB-C; IPTV
- Analogue channels: FM: 87.8-104 MHz; Analogue cable
- Webcast: http://mp3.rtvslo.si/val202
- Official website: http://val202.rtvslo.si/
- Language: Slovene

Val 202 is a public-owned Slovenian radio station.

== Overview ==
The station is the second station of the public broadcaster Radio Slovenija and one of the most listened-to stations in Slovenia. It broadcasts indie and pop music, news and phone-in programmes. Val 202 is famous for its sports coverage and commentaries.

Until mid-February 2025, Val 202 aired advertising for natural supplements disguised as talk shows, which received criticism from listeners.

== Name ==
Formerly it used to broadcast on AM frequency 1484 kHz - equal to 202 metres wavelength, hence the name Val 202 ("val" means "wave" in Slovene).
