= Mass media in Slovenia =

The mass media in Slovenia refers to mass media outlets based in Slovenia. Television, magazines, and newspapers are all operated by both state-owned and for-profit corporations which depend on advertising, subscription, and other sales-related revenues. The Constitution of Slovenia guarantees freedom of speech and Slovenia ranked 40th in the 2016 Press Freedom Index report compiled by Reporters Without Borders, falling by 5 places if compared to the 2015 Index.

There were 2350 registered media in the government's official Media Registry in July 2020. The gross value of the advertising market in 2008 was of 522.5 million euro, 15% more than in the previous year. The greatest share of advertising goes to television (55%), followed by print press (30%), outdoor media (7%), radio (4.4%) and online media (3.5%).

The main media companies include three print media (Delo, Dnevnik and Večer) and two broadcast media (Radiotelevizija Slovenija and Pro Plus). The biggest remains the public service broadcaster RTV Slovenia, with a 124.7 million euro turnover (2008), of which 62.2% from subscription fees. Advertising covers from 1/3 to 1/2 of the main newspapers' budget.

In Slovenia, the print press has a wider reach (89%) than radio and television (around 66%). The individual average TV viewing time is of 3 hours.

The media considered left by the right wing politicians includes all the big five media outlets (Delo, Dnevnik, Večer, Radiotelevizija Slovenija and Pro Plus including Pop TV and Kanal A). The media considered right by the left includes smaller outlets such as weekly Reporter and Demokracija, television station Nova24, and websites Domovina.je and Casnik.si.

== Legislative framework ==
The Constitution of Slovenia guarantees freedom of speech and freedom of the press. The law forbids hate speech and incitement to violence and intolerance.

Slovenia had to revamp its media legislation following independence, democratisation and economic liberalisation. Between 1991 and 1994, when the first Media Law was adopted, the allocation of the main broadcasting frequencies was done by the national authority, the Telecommunications Office, although without legal basis. The Media Law instituted a Broadcasting Council, responsible for licence allocations, which inherited an exhausted frequency fund, chaotic ownership relations, and invalid (or non-existent) programming concepts, and could this hardly influence the development of the sector.

The 2001 Media Law (Section 9) protects media plurality and diversity by restricting media concentration. According to the Media Law the publisher of a daily newspaper, or any natural or legal person, or group of related persons, who has more than a 20% share in the capital or assets of that publisher, or more than 20% of management or voting rights, may not be an owner or co-founder of a radio or television broadcaster, and may not engage in radio and television activities. Radio and television broadcasters are subject to the same restrictions concerning daily newspapers ownership.

Media Law amendments in 2006 abolished the former maximum ownership cap at 33% for any persons, foreigners included, and extended the “right to correction” available to anyone upset or offended by published information (even if truthful) and willing to present his/her opposite version of facts - to be published in the same place (front page included) and with the same or larger space of the original. This led to ample "corrections", in one case covering two pages of a magazine.

The 2003 Access to Public Information Act guarantees free access to public information. The Office of the Information Commissioner is tasked with handling access requests. Its scope was expanded in 2014 to make the act applicable also to private companies when carrying out public functions.

Differently from most countries in the region (including Western Balkan countries), defamation in Slovenia remains a criminal offense possibly leading to prison terms. Journalists can also be legally compelled to reveal their sources. Publishing classified information is a criminal offense too, since the new 2008 Penal Code. The 2008 reform of the Penal Code spurred by the Janez Janša's government cancelled the provision protecting journalists when divulgating classified information with the intent of bringing irregularities to light (whistleblowing). Several high-level cases of prosecutions against journalists have brought the issue to the fore. Journalists reporting on classified documents leaked to them by political opponents have been hit by legal actions by the targets of the leaks. Both journalists' associations have urged the government to reform the legislative framework to ensure press freedom and allow for investigative journalism. A public interest protection clause finally entered into force on 20 October 2015, though defamation still carries criminal penalties.

=== Status and self-regulation of journalists ===
Building of RTV Slovenia (Television's part)

Liberalisation, privatisation, and the transformation of the journalism profession from advocacy journalism of Marxist–Leninist tradition to Western-style standards of impartiality required the development of self-regulatory bodies and codes of journalistic ethics.

The Slovenian Association of Journalists drafted in 1988 a first new code of journalistic ethics, in which the role of the journalist shifted from a “socio-political worker” to a communicator “primarily responsible to the public”. The code was later amended in 1991 and 2002, with the publication of today's Kodeks novinarjev Slovenije (“Code of Slovenian Journalists”).

The Novinarsko častno razsodišče (“Ethics Commission of Journalists”, NČR) was established in 1997 by the same Slovenian Association of Journalists in 1997, with 9 journalists or editors as members, and the aim to strengthen ethical and professional standards and ensure that journalistic authors respect the standards written in the Code of Slovenian Journalists. Anyone can file complaints to the NČR for violations of the Code standards. Proceedings are public and can lead to a declaration, a statement of infringement, or a settlement - and even to the exclusion of a journalist from the Association or the Journalists' Union, in extreme cases. However, no such extreme case has happened yet, and other cases rarely trigger reconsideration. NČR decisions maintain a private character and have no public officiality.

On paper the Mass Media Act 2006 grants journalistic autonomy, but it does not establish to which degree, stipulating instead that this is up to the statute of the publishers. Also, the law does not establish any procedure for conflict resolution between journalists and management or between journalists themselves, leaving it up to the publisher. The Slovenian Journalists Association (DNS) has said that the media law should be modernized.

While not specifically for journalists, the Employment Relationship Act has been used against them. In particular it "stipulates that the worker is obliged to refrain from all actions that in view of the nature of work which he or she does could cause material or moral damage or harm the business interests of the employer" and it "prohibits a worker from exploiting for his private use or from disclosing to a third person an employer's commercial confidentialities as defined by the employer that were either entrusted to the worker or that were learned in any other way"

The Varuh pravic poslušalcev in gledalcev (“Listener and Viewer Ombudsman”) of RTV Slovenia was appointed for the first time in 2008, according to art.16 of the RTV Slovenia Law, to "address the comments and suggestions of viewers and listeners" and "give instructions to the director-general regarding changes that must be effected on channels.”

The full-time employment of journalists in Slovenia decreased in after the 2008 financial crisis. In April 2014, the Slovenian news agency STA reported that public broadcaster RV had hired 85 journalists in 2012-2015, while only 25 were hired by the private media in the same period. The use of part-time contracts and other forms of free-lance collaboration also increased, leading to a degradation of journalists' social rights.

== Public broadcaster ==
The 1994 Law on RTV Slovenia regulates public broadcasting. RTV Slovenia has a Programming Council and a Supervisory Board; RTV is required by law to be independent and autonomous, to respect human integrity and dignity in its programs, to observe the principle of impartiality, and to ensure the truthfulness of information and the pluralism of opinions and religious beliefs. The law also requires the public broadcaster to provide radio and TV programs for the Italian and Hungarian minorities in Slovenia.

After EU accession, the new 2005 Law on RTV Slovenia reintroduced a dominant role of the state and the executive in the appointment of RTV's governing bodies, excluding civil society institutions (e.g. universities, association of writers, and sports organisations) which were previously involved. The draft law raised several domestic and international criticisms, including from the International Federation of Journalists and the Council of Europe, but the Slovenian institutions dismissed most of them and went along with adopting the new law in November 2005, which was later narrowly confirmed by 50.7% of voters in a special referendum.

The current governance system of RTV Slovenia allows control over almost all managerial bodies and over the appointment of all key editors to the governmental majority. Majority parties also control the majority of the new Programming Council and Supervisory Board of RTVS, thus being also able to appoint RTVS' Director General, who will in turn appoint and manage the directors of radio and TV, the editors-in-chief, and the senior management. This governance system is deemed a threat to the independence and credibility, trust, and respect with the public of RTV Slovenia by the European Journalism Centre. The following period indeed saw a host of cases of political interference in the editorial and journalistic work of the Slovenian public broadcaster, whose public credibility (particularly for the TV) fell dramatically.

The decisions concerning appointments dismissal of several journalists from RTV Slovenia in 2015 have ignited a debate within the broadcaster, giving rise also to claims that procedures were not followed properly by the management. The Slovenian Association of Journalists expressed its concerns

== Media outlets ==
More than 1,300 media outlets are registered in Slovenia, of which around 1,000 printed ones. Most Slovenian media followed a trend of commercialisation of contents in order to withstand the 2008 financial crisis. Journalists' job security degraded, and the main free press daily was shut down. The spread in number of the Slovenian media goes along with the trend of "copy-paste journalism", in a process of pauperisation that is seen as having a detrimental effect on the overall quality of journalism in the country.

Slovenia features a limited media market, due to the reduced circulation of Slovene. This hampers the economic potential of media firms and makes it difficult for outsiders to enter the market. The market is easily saturated, and provides no incentive for smaller media, which thus require state support to survive. State subsidies, also indirectly in the form of advertising revenues from state-controlled companies (Telekom Slovenije, Petrol Group). Publications with a more critical outlook find it more difficult to secure advertising from state-owned companies. This in turn risk transforming into a mechanism of economic blackmailing, fostering self-censorship.

Media ownership should be registered by law, but compliance is patchy and ownership structures are often opaque and frequently shifting.

Media owners in Slovenia lack strategic ownership, and do not reinvest profits into media firms. Most Slovenian tycoons emerged from the privatisation processes through managerial bail-out processes thanks to bank loans, without investing personal income in the process, and thus leaving companies with big loans to repay.

=== Print media ===
The first magazine for women, Slovenka (meaning Slovenian Woman in English), was published in Slovenia in 1896. During the 1960s the literary magazines played a significant role in Slovenia's liberalization.

In 2004 there were nearly 1,000 printed media in Slovenia, including newspapers, magazines and journals. In addition to local magazines, the Slovenian versions of foreign magazine titles, such as Playboy, Elle and Men's Health, are also distributed in the country.

The Slovenian media market saw very limited foreign investments after independence and liberalization. In the print press, no foreign owner was present until the 2000s, as the market was deemed saturated and solid. State-owned trusts still held shares in several media groups, with consequent political influences. After the 2004 elections, the company chairmen and editors in chief at the dailies Delo, Večer, and Primorske novice were changed after the managers of the state-controlled trusts were replaced by the new government, in a spillover of spoils system in the media sector. This did not happen again when the left came back to power in 2008, but the relations between media leadership and the economic-political elite continue to be turbulent during the following economic crisis years.

The Slovenian press landscape include, first, nationally-oriented and -distributed publications, either daily or weekly; second, daily or weekly publications that are focused on a regional scale, though they may be nationally distributed too; and third, local newspapers, mostly weeklies or periodicals, with a strong community base but limited geographical distribution.

In 2008, data on sold circulation put the total number of daily newspapers at 260,000 copies, with 1.17 million readers and 16.6 percent share of the gross advertising pie. Among the top three dailies were the broadsheet Delo (readership 138,000) and the tabloid Slovenske novice (readership 342,000), both held by the Delo d.d. company, which controls half of the readership for daily newspapers.

Žurnal24, a free press newspaper of the Austrian media company Styria Verlag, had a readership of 242,000. It was discontinued by Styria Verlag after 15 May 2014, citing losses of more than 40 million euros since its establishment in 2003.

Slovenian dailies includes Ljubljana-focused Dnevnik (125,000 readers), with the Sunday's Nedeljski dnevnik and the weekly tabloid Hopla; North-Eastern Maribor-based Večer (122,000) and South-Western Primorske novice (65,000), which share supplements. Dobro Jutro is a free weekly, regionally oriented (based in Maribor) but with nationwide distribution. The dailies Ekipa (sport) and Finance (business) complete the framework.

Local newspapers and magazines, weeklies or bi-weeklies, include Kranj's bi-daily Gorenjski glas with a readership of 49,000; Novo Mesto's weekly Dolenjski list, 45,000; Celje's weekly Novi tednik 44,000; Murska Sobota's weekly Vestnik, 59,000. Other local and thematic publications have even small reach, except the Catholic Church's weekly Družina (107,000 readers).

Political magazines are another important share of the print press. Mladina (64,000 readers in 2009) leads this market sector since the mid-1980s, as a critical tribune. It was joined in the 1990s by the more right-wing oriented weekly Mag, being bought by Delo and turning more centrist after 2006/08. In 2008 a new right-wing magazine, Reporter, appeared on the market.

The first foreign investors in the Slovenian print press market arrived in the 2000s, when the Swedish group Bonnier AG and its partner Dagens Industri relaunched the newspaper Finance. Then, the Austrian company Styria Verlag bought one fourth of the Ljubljana daily Dnevnik and published the free daily Žurnal (2003–14) and weekly Žurnal24 (2007-2014). The Austrian company Leykam also publishes the free weekly Dober Dan.

Other foreign companies in the Slovenian media market include Burda, whose Adria media publishes various Slovenian versions of international magazines, such as Playboy, Elle, Lisa and Men's Health, and the widespread tabloid Nova, with 99,000 readers. Delo Revije remains the main magazine publisher, with Lady, Jana, Obrazi, Anja, Smrklja, Eva, Modna Jana, Ambient and Stop, with an overall readership of beyond 748,000. Other international magazines that publish Slovenian versions include the men's magazine FHM (48,000 readers), the National Geographic (154,000 readers), and the Reader's Digest (78,000 readers).

In 2014 Delo Publishing decided to sell its 79% stake in Maribor's Večer daily, which it had acquired in 2008 and had been declared in breach of competition regulations the following year. The shares were sold to the newly founded Dober Večer company for a third of what originally expected, in what was seen as a shady deal. The Office for the Protection of Competition approved the sale despite protests from the Večer journalists.

=== Publishing ===
The small market for book publishing in Slovene has made it difficult for publishers to achieve financial sustainability. In the 1990s book sales have been in slow but steady growth, with the highest income of 89.1 million euros in 1998. Yet, the 2000s showed a dramatic decline and crisis of the book publishing industry, due to lack of distribution in smaller towns and high taxation. Library readerships to the contrary increased. In mid-2000 print media companies such as Delo and Dnevnik started selling books as supplement to newspapers, to lure readers thanks to lower prices than in the main bookstores Mladinska knjiga and DZS.

=== Radio broadcasting ===
Slovenia has 7 nationwide radio stations, and several local and web-based ones. In 2008, 98 radio license holders were registered, of whom 11 were broadcasting via cable or internet only. Nationwide radio broadcasts are provided by the three main channels of Radio Slovenija (with an average daily reach of 200,000 in 2008), as well as by the non-profit radio station Radio Ognjišče, owned by the Slovenian Roman Catholic Church. Infonet, a network of 30 radio stations, declared a daily reach of about 430,000 in 2008.

The whole of Slovenia together with all its population is covered by few radio stations, namely Radio Slovenija 1, Radio Slovenija 2, and Radio Slovenija 3. The largest coverage among private radio stations is that of the non-profit radio station Radio Ognjišče, owned by Slovenian Roman Catholic Church. Public radio stations have an important advantage regarding reach. Radio Slovenija reaches 2 more than 250,000 people every day, followed by Radio Slovenija 1 with a daily reach of about 200,000 people, at the same time, Infonet, a network of 30 radio stations, has according to its own estimates, a daily reach of about 430,000.

Radio Ljubljana went on air on 28 October 1928, marking the start of radio broadcasts in Slovenia, which remained controlled by the state both in the interwar and in the socialist perioda, when journalists were regarded as “socio-political workers”.

After independence in 1991, Radio Ljubljana was turned into the national public broadcaster Radio Slovenija as part of RTV Slovenia. It remains mostly funded from license fees, coupled with advertising revenues. The public broadcaster includes 8 channels: Radio Slovenija 1, Radio Slovenija 2, Radio Slovenija 3, Radio Koper, Radio Maribor, Radio Capodistria for the Italian minority in Slovenia, Pomurski Madžarski Radio (MMR) for the Hungarian minority in Slovenia, and Radio Slovenia International. The Law requires RTV Slovenia, as a radio public broadcaster, to produce and broadcast a wide array of news, culture, education and entertainment content, and to pay special attention to the Slovene national minorities in the neighboring countries (in Italy, in Austria and in Hungary), to Italian and Hungarian minorities in Slovenia, and to the members of the Roma community.

The liberalisation of the media opened up radio broadcasting to a host of private radio stations, of which 61 are commercial radio programmes, while 18 are non-profit, regional, local or student “radio programmes of special importance”, which receive state subsidies through open calls, besides advertising.

The Slovenian radio panorama includes no foreign investors. According to the European Journalism Centre (EJC), the marked did not recover from a flawed privatisation process in the early 1990s, when multiple licenses were allocated based on personal relations rather than objective criteria. The newer, smaller radio stations only survived in an overcrowded market by joining wider networks, whose set-up was unsupervised. There are six radio “groups” in Slovenia, but only one can be regarded as a network according to the EJC. Infonet registered itself in 2002 as a network of 30 radio stations, half of which have shared ownership and half are "associate members". Infonet stations share technical services, musical section, program and advertising production sections, legal service and promotion departments, and are linked through programming, advertising and ownership, all of which can influence the programming concepts on the basis of which these radio stations acquired broadcasting licenses. The Ministry of Culture accepted at face value Infonet's declaration of fulfillment of the Media Act requirements.

Radio and television broadcasters can form a network, if each member broadcasts only within the area for which its license was issued, produces at least two hours in-house programming per day, and acquires approval from the Agencija za pošto in ektronske komunikacije (APEK), the Post and Electronic Communications Agency, if its programming has changed as a consequence of networking, as stated in Art. 83 of the Media Act (Zakon o medijih).

The Media Law also forbids cross-ownership of radio and television channels (art. 59). A radio or TV channel owner can control up to 20% of a newspaper and vice versa (art. 56). No limits are foreseen concerning cross-ownerships with magazines. TLC companies cannot own a radio or TV channel either (Pro Plus tried to obtain a radio license for years, but unsuccessfully, and also dropped its radio news production project 24ur – radijske novice after few years in 2004).

=== Television broadcasting ===
Television in Slovenia was first introduced in 1958. Slovenia used the PAL standard until December 1, 2010 when analog broadcasting ceased. The first TV station in Slovenia was launched in 1958 as TV Ljubljana (now TV Slovenija). The first commercial (private) TV station, Kanal A was launched in 1991.

Experimental DVB-T broadcasts began in 2001 using the MPEG-2 standard. In 2007 the Slovenian government decided to test DVB-T transmission in Ljubljana using the MPEG-4 standard, following the approval of the APEK (Agency for Post and Telecommunications Republic of Slovenia). After that Radiotelevizija Slovenija had to determine which transmitter would be used for the 3-month test. They settled on the transmitters made by a Slovene company, Elti, who produces analog and digital TV transmitters. After the test, the RTV SLO decided to expand transmissions to TV SLO 2. In 2007, the RTV SLO launched a new channel: TV SLO 3 (a public affairs broadcast) to its digital offering. High-definition broadcast with AC-3 was experimented during the Beijing 2008 olympic games. The 2010 Winter Olympic Games were also broadcast in HD. Currently, there are two multiplexes operating, Mux A and Mux C. The operator of Mux A is Radiotelevizija Slovenija. Mux A is intended for public programs. Mux C started on October 14, 2013. The operator is Radiotelevizija Slovenija. Mux C is intended for commercial programs.

=== Cinema ===
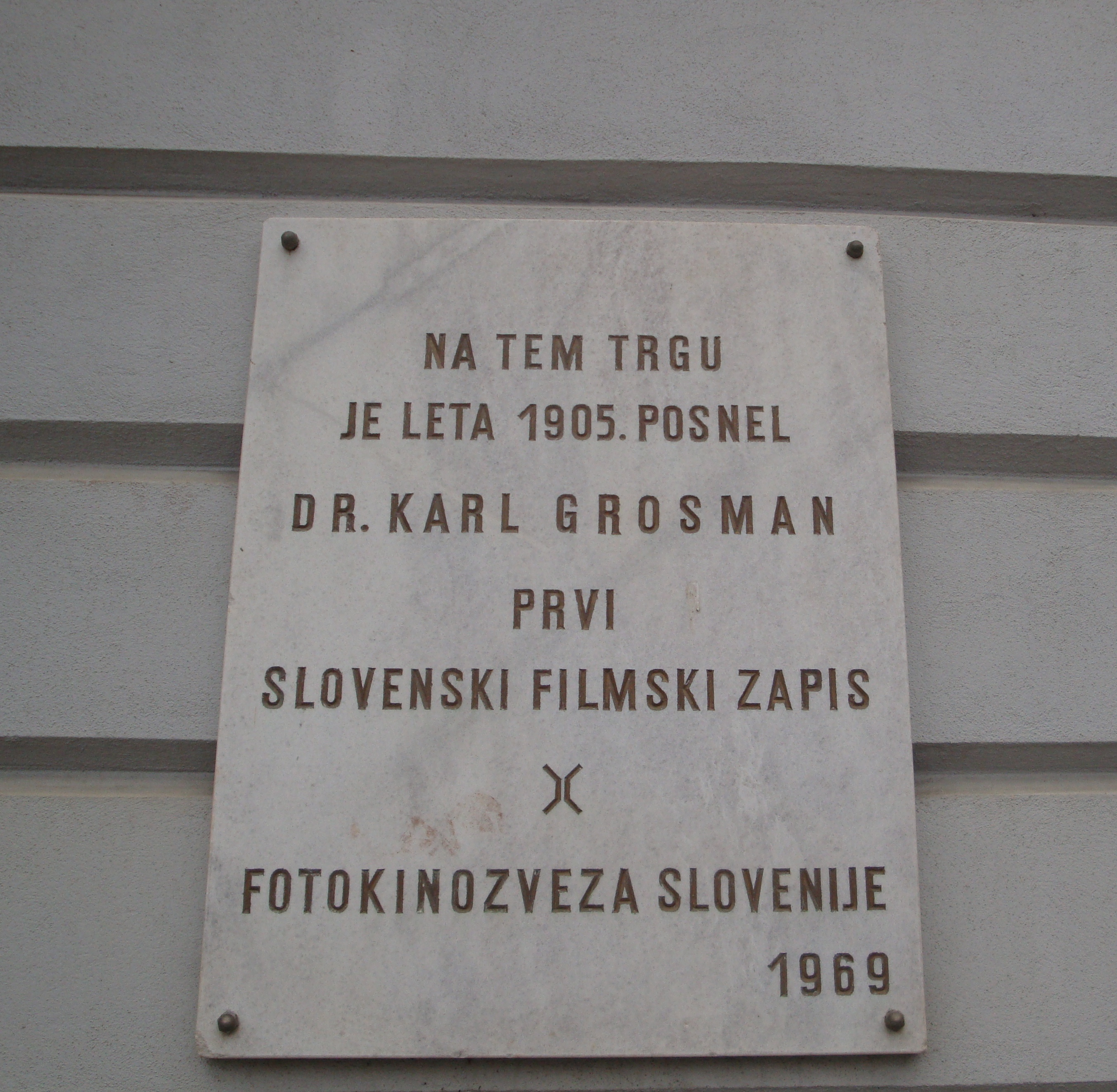
A plaque commemorating first Slovene film recording made in 1905 by Karol Grossmann in Ljutomer

Traditional cinema theatres in Slovenia are giving ground to multiplex cinema theatres, in Ljubljana and in the other main centres. Cinema admissions varied from 3.8 million in 1989 to 1.9 million in 1999 and 2.4 million in 2008. The biggest players are Kolosej - with 26 theatres and about 5,000 seats in Ljubljana, Maribor, Koper and Kranj - and Planet Tuš, with 18 theatres and 6,000 seats in Maribor, Celje, Novo Mesto, and Kranj (data 2008). The number of distributed audiovisual works in 2008 was of 654, of which 16.4% of Slovenian origin, 76.6 from the rest of the EU, and 7.0% from the United States. The DVD market displayed similar shares of origin.

In Socialist Yugoslavia times, the national film producer Viba Film was the monopolist. After independence, Viba was disbanded and remained as a modern film studio, used for most Slovenian productions. Producers apply with their film projects to the national Film Fund, which decides which one to co-finance according to the Law on Slovenian Film Fund, sometimes with a majority of even full share of the movie budget. RTV Slovenia also co-produces or even produces movies. Other movies are produced and filmed without state subsidies; the Film Fund then enables their distribution in the theatres. The number of movies produced in Slovenia was of 45 in 2008.

=== Telecommunications ===
Slovenia has a 100,1% rate of mobile phone penetration as of 2009; the combined fixed-line and mobile-cellular teledensity is of roughly 150 telephones per 100 persons, or 1,5 phones per person. The country counts 17 AM radio stations and 63 FM stations, as well as 20 TV broadcast stations (2014).

The Slovenian TLC market features as main player the state-owned company Telekom Slovenije, which holds more than 75% of the revenues together with its daughter companies Mobitel and Siol. The fourth player is the private provider Si.mobil, overwhelmingly (92.2%) owned by the Austrian company Mobilkom. Mobile TLC providers hold almost half of market revenues.

=== Internet ===
The use of internet in Slovenia is widespread. In 2011, 73% households had Internet access, and 67% households had broadband. As of 2011, 29% of Slovenians have never used Internet. In 2012 Slovenia had 1,5 million internet users, of which more than 500,000 broadband.

There are no government restrictions on access to the Internet or credible reports that the government monitors e-mail or Internet chat rooms without appropriate legal authority. The constitution and law provide for freedom of speech and press, and the government generally respects these rights. However, the law prohibits hate speech, including incitement to intolerance as well as violence. The law provides criminal penalties for defamation that harms a person's honor or name. The constitution and laws prohibit arbitrary interference with privacy, family, home, or correspondence and the government generally respects these prohibitions in practice. Individuals and groups freely engage in the expression of views via the Internet.

The independent organization Helpline Spletno Oko (Web Eye) monitors the presence of hate speech and child pornography on the Internet and received on average 62 reports and tips per month in 2012.

On 28 January 2010 the Slovenian National Assembly adopted changes to the law governing gambling. Under the law Internet service providers are responsible for blocking access to Internet gambling web sites that are not licensed by the Slovenian government.

Several media outlets publish in online format only. These include rtvslo.si, vfokusu.com, Siol.net, Pozareport.si, Spletnicasopis.eu, Domovina.je, Casnik.si, and Portalplus.si.

== Media organisations ==
=== Media agencies ===
The Slovenian Press Agency (STA – Slovenska tiskovna agencija) is the state-run news agency, established as a limited liability company, publishing wires in Slovenian and English. It is partially funded from the national budget and partially from commercial activities, as stipulated by the relevant legal act on the agency.

==== Government's decision to stop funding STA ====
On 30 November 2020, Slovenian government led by Janez Janša silently took the decision to stop funding STA, despite the relevant act stipulating that such funding shall be provided. Initially, it did not communicate the reason for doing so, but later claimed that the agency was unwilling to disclose the information on its operations. The agency responded that the scope of the information requested by the Slovenian Government Communications Office far surpassed what the office may legitimately request and that only the government itself may request such information. The national radio and television network reported that the government aims at censoring the agency.

This was further corroborated by Marko Milosavljević, professor of journalism at the University of Ljubljana: "The dangerous and undemocratic decision by the Government of the Republic of Slovenia to stop funding STA [...] should not be understood as a single excess but as the continuation of several months of pressures on the media. Yesterday's government's decision is only the continuation of the government's negative policy towards the media, intimidation, financial harm, or even destruction of all the media that are not aligned with the government. [...] This is the line that has been continuing and escalating to the degree where things have become not only undemocratic but also illegal."

=== Trade unions ===
Slovenia has two journalists' associations:

- The Slovenian Journalists' Association, Društvo novinarjev Slovenije (DNS), is linked to the 1907 first association founded by Slovenian journalists
- The Association of Journalists and Commentators, Združenje novinarjev in publicistov (ZNP) was founded in 2007

=== Regulatory authorities ===
The media sector in Slovenia is mainly regulated by the Ministry for Culture and its Inspectorate for culture and media and Directorate for Media. The implementation of the Media Law is monitored by the Ministry, while the Media Inspector instructs administrative proceedings to investigate breaches to the law, on its own initiative or based upon complaints received from the public. The capacity for media oversight by the Inspectorate is hindered by lack of personnel – it operates with only one media inspector, who is at the same time responsible for leading the Inspectorate. The Ministry of Culture also handles also public complaints about the media.

The Agency for Post and Electronic Communications of the Republic of Slovenia (APEK) and the Broadcasting Council (SRDF) are the regulatory bodies responsible for broadcasting and telecommunications. APEK ensures the implementation of the Law on Electronic Communications and checks that radio and TV stations comply with the programming guidelines and restrictions set by the Media Law. The Broadcasting Council, an independent body, instruct APEK to issue special licenses and checks that broadcasters comply with the license obligations.

== Censorship and media freedom ==
Slovenia is ranked 40th on 180 in Reporters Without Borders' 2016 World Press Freedom Index, falling by 5 places if compared to the 2015 Index. Its ranking badly degraded from 10th (2006) to 46th (2010), to then improve slightly in the following years.

Open censorship is absent in Slovenia, yet political pressures on journalists have been reported when covering elections or politically sensitive issues, often leading to self-censorship cases.

Differently from most countries in the region (including Western Balkan countries), defamation in Slovenia remains a criminal offense possibly leading to prison terms. Journalists can also be legally compelled to reveal their sources. Publishing classified information is a criminal offense too, since the new 2008 Penal Code. The 2008 reform of the Penal Code spurred by the Janez Janša's government cancelled the provision protecting journalists when divulgating classified information with the intent of bringing irregularities to light (whistleblowing). Several high-level cases of prosecutions against journalists have brought the issue to the fore. Journalists reporting on classified documents leaked to them by political opponents have been hit by legal actions by the targets of the leaks. Both journalists' associations have urged the government to reform the legislative framework to ensure press freedom and allow for investigative journalism. A public interest protection clause was finally introduced in Slovenian legislation in July 2015, though defamation still carries criminal penalties.

=== Attacks and threats against journalists ===
Compared to the rest of the Western Balkans, Slovenia is relatively safe for journalists. Physical violence against journalists has not been reported in the last years, and revenge violence is rare too.

=== Prosecutions for publication of classified information ===
- Two journalist from Dnevnik, Meta Roglič and Peter Lovšin, were investigated for a March 2013 article on a political conflict within the state intelligence and security agency SOVA between politicised factions linked to former PM Janez Janša on the right and businessman Bojan Petan on the left. The report, deemed clearly in the public interest, was based on information leaked from within SOVA.
- In 2012 the Delo journalist and OCCRP partner Anuška Delić was charged with having illegally obtained and disseminated classified information after a report linking Janez Janša's SDS party, the far-right organisation "Blood and Honour" and the Slovenian Army in the town of Žiri, which was published during the electoral campaign for the 2011 elections. She was charged, together with the former SOVA director Sebastjan Selan (for inaction), two weeks after the appointment of Damir Črnčec as new SOVA head by the Janez Janša government. Delić risked up to three years of prison. She always claimed the trial to be politically motivated. In 2014 Delić found that the prosecution had unsuccessfully asked for a warrant to wiretap her communications. Janša later came out as defending Delić, and claiming that the indictment is a way for the judiciary to protect the wrongdoing of former SOVA head Selan. The case received wide coverage, also fostering warnings from the OSCE Media Freedom Representative Dunja Mijatovic; it was deemed particularly problematic for its political background and its possible cooling effect on investigative journalism, eventual leading to more self-censorship. All charges against Delić were dropped by mid-April 2015, with the journalist being fully acquitted. Yet, the state prosecutor maintained that she was "guilty", in a move that was deemed as damaging to her reputation and aimed to have a chilling effect on other Slovenian journalists. Changes to the Slovenian Penal Code were brought in October 2015, introducing a public interest protection clause.
- RTV journalist Erik Valenčič was summoned by the prosecutor and charged with disseminating classified information on 28 January 2015 after, in a January 2014 TV documentary, he had made public a SOVA report on the Slovene extreme right. Valenčič claims the report, handed by SOVA to a Parliamentary committee in September 2012, did not contain sensitive information and was anyhow edited by him to exclude legitimately confidential information.
- The journalist and editor of politikis.si, Dejan Kaloh, was accused of publishing classified information concerning the Janša trial in its book "Od partije do Patrie" ("From the Party to Patria"). He was subject to a police house search in January 2014. Janša's SDS claim that Kaloh's house search was a revenge against his revelations of an "illegal injunction" to carry out financial investigations on the later-convicted Janša.
- In April 2014 the Finnish YLE journalist Magnus Berglund won a case against the former PM Janez Janša at the Ljubljana District Court. Jansa was ordered to pay the trail expenses. He did not appeal.

=== Political and business pressures ===
Investigative journalism in Slovenia is hindered by links between media tycoons and the intelligence services.

- In 2012 former SOVA chief Sebastjan Selan took the position of chief executive of Marina Portorož and in 2013 of director of Terme Čatež - two companies owned by the businessman Bojan Petan, already prosecuted for alleged abuse of position and abuse of trust. He is accused together with businessman and lobbyist Franci Zavrl of embezzlement of 26 million euros and of leading to 54 million euros in damages at the companies later run by Selan. Petan is also investigated by Bosnia and Herzegovina's authorities for alleged organised crime and money laundering.
- Bojan Petan is also the owner of the daily Dnevnik. When Petan was investigated, Dnevnik avoid mentioning the charges for organized crime and money laundering, and initially mentioned only Zavrl's name after the houses of both men were searched by the police.

Various forms of political pressure are also still used.

- Former PM Janez Janša tweeted about Erik Valenčič on 27 January 2015, defining him as a “potential terorist” (sic) and addressing the message to the Israeli foreign ministry and the CIA, and including the hashtag “#airportsecurity”, together with three personal photos of Valenčič, one of which of him holding a weapon during his time as a correspondent from Iraq in 2006. The tweet was deprecated by RWB as aimed at damaging the credibility of the journalist and making it more difficult for him to travel abroad.
- In March 2016 former PM Janez Janša used Twitter to target journalists again, this time using sexist insult against Eugenija Carl and Mojca Šetinc Pašek. They had reported on RTV Slovenija that three of his fellow Slovenian Democratic Party members where subscribed to a neo-nazi group on Facebook.

=== Civil defamation lawsuits ===
- The weekly Mladina was sued by the far-right Slovenian National Party MP Srečko Prijatelj after having described him as "cerebrally bankrupt" following his homophobic declarations on a same-sex partnership bill. Slovenian courts ruled in favour of Prijatelj, holding that Mladina had exceeded the boundaries of permissible criticism. In 2014, Mladina won the case in front of the European Court of Human Rights. The Strasbourg judges ruled that Slovenian courts had failed in striking a balance between freedom of speech and the protection of reputation of a politician, in what was seen as a landmark precedent.

=== Smear campaigns ===
- In the late 2014, a sexual scandal involving a videotape of the headmaster and of a professor at a high school in Maribor was covered by all the media of the country. One of the two persons involved later committed suicide. The DNS journalists' union condemned the coverage as an infringement of privacy rights, accusing media editors of having failed in the responsibility to evaluate public interest. DNS and other media later signed a Public Commitment for Better Media, pledging to respect the journalists' ethics code and improve media content.

=== Investigative journalism ===
To address the issues of lack of proper investigative journalism tradition in Slovenia, a non-profit online investigative media The Bottom Line ("Pod črto") has been established in September 2014. To assure independence and neutrality, they operate on a donation-based business model.

=== Self-censorship ===
According to the OSCE Representative on Freedom of the Media Dunja Mijatović, the criminal code has been abused to prevent journalists from covering specific topics, thus fostering self-censorship. In many cases the owner sets his editorial agenda by placing the journalists under the direct influence of the manager. This is possible because provisions for editorial autonomy are poor. In a one year period (April 2006 - August 2007) the trade union of journalists noted 26 cases of journalists sanctioned or disciplined for opinions they had expressed. In many cases provisions of the Employment Relationship Act were used. In other cases business reasons are used as excuses. Because of self-censorship external censorship is less necessary.

== Media ownership ==
=== Transparency ===
Transparency of media ownership refers to the public availability of accurate, comprehensive and up-to-date information about media ownership structures. A legal regime guaranteeing transparency of media ownership makes possible for the public as well as for media authorities to find out who effectively owns, controls and influences the media as well as media influence on political parties or state bodies.

In Slovenia, transparency of media ownership is regulated through the Mass Media Act (adopted in 2001) which requires all media outlets to publish the following information every year in the Official Journal of the Republic of Slovenia: the full name and address of permanent residence of any individual/or business name and head office and address of any company which holds a share of at least 5% of the capital in the company's assets or a share of at least 5% of the management or voting rights, and the full names of the members of the board of director or management body and supervisory board. Furthermore, the law provides that any changes must be reported by the publisher to the Official Journal within thirty days since their occurrence and that this information must be published within fifteen days since reception.

The same law sets forth transparency requirements related to the management and the editorial policy.

=== Concentration and pluralism ===
Slovenia has laws limiting concentration of ownership, but flaws exist and implementation is weak. Media ownership changes often and it is difficult to map it, but it is quite concentrated and politicized.

==== Legal framework ====
After the independence from Yugoslavia in 1991 there was a discussion whether media privatization should be regulated by a 1992 law regulating privatization of any kind of company or by a law specific for media.

In the end the choice went to the latter: the Mass Media Act (ZJG) passed in 1994 dealt alto media privatisation. It envisaged a special model of media privatisation, which implied an internal buyout, allowing employees to acquire the majority shareholding in their companies. The Act had a section about the protection of plurality, which however "dealt exclusively with external (owner-related) plurality, and did not as much as mention internal plurality (of content)." Moreover, the Act failed "to stipulate legal sanctions for violations". 40% of the shares of each company what was privatized were given to state funds (20% to the Development Fund, 10% to the Capital Fund, and 10% to Compensation Fund), which then sold most of them, typically to investment funds. Overall the law was based on the idea that privatization and deregulation was enough to grant media independence, as if the only possible enemy of the freedom of the press was the state.

A new Mass Media Act (Zmed) was approved in 2001 and it was further revised in 2006 abolishing "the former restrictions on ownership to 33% for any person, including foreigners, and [assigning] the task of restricting ownership concentration to the state".

Statues defines clear rules for ensuring media pluralism and set up authorities to monitor compliance. Permission from the Ministry of Culture (which consults with the Agency for Post and Electronic Communication, the Securities Market Agency, the Competition Protection Office and the Broadcasting Council) is needed in order to be able to acquire 20% or more of the proprietary shares or the voting rights in media (newspaper, television or radio) companies. Compliance is monitored by several authority bodies.

Cross-media concentration is limited or, in certain cases, prohibited, in particular:

- an owner cannot be involved both in radio and television broadcasting;
- the owner of a radio or a television channel cannot control more than 20% of the shares or voting rights at a daily newspaper;
- the owner of a daily newspaper cannon control more than 20% of the shares or voting rights of a radio or a television channel;
- advertising agencies cannot control more than 20% of the shares or voting rights of a radio or television channel;
- telecommunications companies cannot own a radio or television channel.

There are no limits regarding cross-media ownership of magazines, radio or television channels.

Media publishers and broadcasters are also subject to the Protection of Competition Act (ZPOMK).

==== Practice ====
Overall the Slovenian media market is small, so control is possible without much resources.

The result of Mass Media Act 1994 was a concentration of ownership in the hands of state funds. This happened, e.g., with daily newspaper Delo.

Concentration of media ownership is high, posing a medium risk according to Media Pluralism Monitor. Media legislation is detailed but implementation is weak and regulatory bodies are ineffective and slow in its implementation. Media ownership changes rapidly and constantly, so it is difficult to map it.

Ownership restriction can be easily bypassed by assigning ownership to family members, since in Slovenian law the definition of "connected persons" is lacking and e.g. "even a father and his siblings are not treated like connected persons". Ownership is also hidden easily with so-called paper companies.

The radio sector has seen a concentrations and takeover process which was particularly intense, so that a 2016 report that called for an update of the Mass Media Act underlined the necessity for radio. Controversial takeovers happened anyway also in the newspapers sector.

Many media companies are in bad financial conditions because they were acquired, often by the managers, with huge loans from banks and then they have to repay them. According to OSCE Representative on Freedom of the Media Dunja Mijatović: "The main problem with media ownership in Slovenia is the absence of strategic ownership. For most of the owners, media are simply an instrument to make quick money. All the profit is taken out of the company, it is not reinvested to improve the quality of editorial products."

==== Public broadcasting and public influence on private media ====
Radiotelevizija Slovenija (RTV) is Slovenia's national public broadcasting organization. The Radio and Television Corporation of Slovenia Act imposes on it rules that aim "at fair, balanced and impartial representation of political viewpoints". It operates three national television channels, two national radio channels, some regional ones (e.g.: TV Koper-Capodistria and Radio Koper) and Radio Slovenia International. Slovenian Press Agency has a dominant position in the news agencies market and is also owned by the state.

The supervisory board of RTV has 11 members. 4 are appointed by the government, that -at least in an instance in 2012- can easily replace them. These and other factors made the Media Pluralism Monitor declare that independence of Public Service Media governance and funding presents a high risk.

According to OSCE Representative on Freedom of the Media Dunja Mijatović "state-owned companies like Telekom and Petrol (...) are the biggest advertisers. Media companies with a critical approach towards the government would not receive advertisement funds from state-owned companies. This is a very effective mechanism of economic blackmailing." According to the Media Pluralism Monitor state advertising is at high risk, as is -more in general- politicisation of control over media outlets.

== See also ==
- Telecommunications in Slovenia
- List of radio stations in Slovenia
- List of newspapers in Slovenia
- List of magazines in Slovenia
- Access to public information in Slovenia
