= List of newspapers in Slovenia =

In 2004, there were nearly 1,000 printed media in Slovenia, including newspapers, magazines and journals.

This article is a list of newspapers published in Slovenia or in Slovene.

== Daily ==
Title	English Title	Content	Format	Est.	Owner	Publisher	Headquarters	Orientation	Website
Delo	Labor	General	Broadsheet	1959	FMR, d.d.	Delo, d.d.	Ljubljana	Left-wing, Social liberalism	delo.si
Dnevnik	Journal	General	Berliner	1951	35%: Državna založba Slovenije (State Publishing House of Slovenia) 25,74%: Styria Media International AG and others	Dnevnik, d.d.	Ljubljana	Left-wing	dnevnik.si
EkipaSN	TeamSN	Daily sports news	/	1995	Media24	Salomon, d.o.o.	Ljubljana	/	ekipa24.si
Finance	Finances	Daily business and financial news	Berliner	1992	Bonnier Group	Časnik Finance, d.o.o.	Ljubljana	Liberalism, Centrism	finance.si
Slovenske novice	Slovenian News	General	Tabloid	1991	Delo, d.d.	Delo, časopisno založniško podjetje d.o.o. (Delo Publishing)	Ljubljana	?	slovenskenovice.si
Večer	Evening	General	Berliner	1945	Dober večer	Časnik Večer, d.o.o.	Maribor	Centrism	vecer.com
Svet24	World24	General	Tabloid	2013	Media24	Salomon, d.o.o.	Ljubljana	?	svet24.si

- Primorske novice (Koper), regional

== Abroad ==
- Časopis Porabje, newspaper of Hungarian Slovenes
- Glasilo kanadskih Slovencev, newspaper of Canadian Slovenes
- Nedelja, Roman Catholic newspaper of Roman Catholic Diocese of Gurk in Klagenfurt, Austria
- Primorski dnevnik, Slovene daily in Trieste, Italy
- Svobodna Slovenija, weekly newspaper of the Argentine Slovenes

== In foreign languages ==
- Népújság, Hungarian minority weekly

== Historical ==
List of historical newspapers include also the newspapers that were published German:

- 1787–1918 Laibacher Zeitung, main German-language newspaper of Ljubljana

== See also ==
- List of magazines in Slovenia
