= List of radio stations in Slovenia =

The following is a list of radio stations in Slovenia. The following list sorts radio stations, broadcast in Slovenia by regions of coverage and type of programming. The list does not include web-only, cable-only and DAB+-only radio stations.

== Radio stations with national coverage ==
=== Public radio stations of Radiotelevizija Slovenija ===
Name	Method of reception	Programming type	Webpage
Radio Slovenija - 1. program	FM, DAB+, DVB-S2	Information, news, oldies, folk and traditional music, culture	
Radio Val 202	FM, DAB+, DVB-S2	Information, adult contemporary, rock, indie, alternative and pop music, live sports coverage	
Ars	FM, DAB+, DVB-S2	Culture, serious classical music, jazz, religion, world music, concerts, literature	
Radio Slovenia International	FM, DAB+, DVB-S2	Information in Slovenian, English, and German, adult contemporary, rock, indie, alternative and pop music, programming for tourists	

=== Private radio stations ===
Name	Method of reception	Programming type	Webpage
Radio Center	FM, DAB+	Pop music, Top 40 format	
Radio 1	FM, DAB+	Pop music, Top 40 format	
Radio Aktual	FM, DAB+	Pop and oldies music from former Yugoslav countries	

=== Non-profit radio stations ===
Name	Method of reception	Programming type	Webpage
Radio Ognjišče	FM, DAB+	Christian radio station, Christian, gospel, folk, traditional and oldies music	

== Radio stations with regional and local coverage ==
=== Regional studios of Radiotelevizija Slovenija ===
Name	Method of reception	Programming type	Webpage
Radio Koper	FM, MW, DAB+	Regional radio for the Slovene coastal region with oldies, pop, rock, and folk music	
Radio Maribor	FM, DAB+	Regional radio for the Slovene Styrian region with oldies, pop, rock, and folk music	

=== Minority radio stations of Radiotelevizija Slovenija ===
Name	Method of reception	Programming type	Webpage
Pomurski madžarski radio	FM, MW, DAB+	Radio station for the Hungarian-speaking minority in the Prekmurje region (northeastern Slovenia) with oldies, pop, and folk music	
Radio Capodistria	FM, MW, DAB+, DVB-S2	Radio station for the Italian-speaking minority in the Slovene coastal region with pop, rock, indie, and alternative music	

=== College radio stations ===
Name	Method of reception	Programming type	Webpage
Mariborski radio Študent (MARŠ)	FM	College radio from Maribor	
Radio Študent	FM, DAB+	College radio from Ljubljana	

=== Regional radio stations with special status ===
Name	Method of reception	Programming type	Webpage
Murski val	FM, MW, DAB+	Regional radio station from Murska Sobota for the Mura Valley region with pop, oldies, and folk music	
Radio Ptuj	FM, DAB+	Regional radio station from Ptuj for the Styria region with pop, oldies, and folk music	
Radio Slovenske gorice	FM	Regional radio station from Lenart v Slovenskih Goricah for the Styria region with pop, oldies, and folk music	
Koroški radio	FM, DAB+	Regional radio station from Slovenj Gradec for the Carinthia region with pop, oldies, and folk music	
Štajerski val	FM, DAB+	Regional radio station from Šmarje pri Jelšah for the Styria region with pop, oldies, and folk music	
Radio Celje	FM, DAB+	Regional radio station from Celje for the Styria region with pop, oldies, and folk music	
Radio Kranj	FM, DAB+	Regional radio station from Kranj for the Upper Carniola region with pop, oldies, and folk music	

=== Local radio stations with special status ===
Name	Method of reception	Programming type	Webpage
Radio Prlek	FM	Local radio station from Ormož for the Styria region with pop, oldies, and folk music	
Radio Rogla	FM, DAB+	Local radio station from Slovenske Konjice for the Styria region with pop, oldies, and folk music	
Radio Krka	FM, DAB+	Local radio station from Novo mesto for the Lower Carniola region with pop and oldies music	
Radio Sraka	FM, DAB+	Local radio station from Novo mesto for the Lower Carniola region with pop, oldies, folk, and traditional music	
Radio Univox	FM	Local radio station from Kočevje for the Lower Carniola region with pop and oldies music	
Radio Gorenc	FM, DAB+	Local radio station from Tržič for the Upper Carniola region with pop, oldies, folk, and traditional music	
Radio Sora	FM, DAB+	Local radio station from Škofja Loka for the Upper Carniola region with pop, oldies, folk, and traditional music	
Radio Triglav	FM, DAB+	Local radio station from Jesenice for the Upper Carniola region with pop, oldies, folk, and traditional music	
Radio 94	FM, DAB+	Local radio station from Postojna for the Inner Carniola region with pop, oldies, folk, and traditional music	
Radio Robin	FM, DAB+	Local radio station from Nova Gorica for the Gorizia region (western Slovenia) with pop and oldies music	
Radio Velenje	FM, DAB+	Local radio station from Velenje for the Šalek Valley area (northern Slovenia) with predominantly Slovenian pop, folk, and traditional music	

=== Regional and local radio with special status ===
Name	Method of reception	Programming type	Webpage
Primorski val (Alpski val and Radio Odmev)	FM, DAB+	Regional radio from Kobarid and Idrija for the Gorizia region (western Slovenia) with pop, oldies, and folk music	

=== Regional and local radio stations without special status ===
Name	Method of reception	Programming type	Webpage
Toti Maxi	FM, DAB+	Local radio station from Ljutomer for the Mura Valley region (northeastern Slovenia) with pop, oldies, and folk music	
Radio Romic	FM	Local radio station from Murska Sobota for the Roma minority in the Mura Valley region (northeastern Slovenia) with pop, oldies, and folk music	
Zeleni val	FM, DAB+	Local radio station from Grosuplje with mostly Slovenian pop and folk music	

=== Private radio stations ===
Name	Method of reception	Programming type	Webpage
Radio 1 80-a	FM, DAB+	Radio station from Ljubljana with pop and oldies music	
Toti Radio	FM, DAB+	Radio station from Maribor with pop music	
Net FM	FM, DAB+	Radio station from Maribor with pop music	
Radio 1 Rock	FM, DAB+	Radio station from Ljubljana with rock, metal, indie, and alternative music	
Radio City	FM, DAB+	Radio station from Maribor with pop music	
MojRadio	FM, DAB+	Radio station from Velenje with pop and oldies music	
Radio Fantasy	FM, DAB+	Radio station from Celje with pop music	
Rock Radio	FM, DAB+	Radio station from Ljubljana with rock, metal, indie, and alternative music	
Radio Antena	FM, DAB+	Radio station from Ljubljana with pop music	
Radio Ekspres	FM, DAB+	Radio station from Ljubljana with pop and oldies music	
Radio Hit	FM, DAB+	Radio station from Domžale with pop music	
Best FM	FM, DAB+	Radio station from Ljubljana with turbo-folk music	
Radio Veseljak	FM, DAB+	Radio station from Ljubljana with 100% Slovenian folk, pop, and traditional music	
Radio Capris	FM, DAB+	Radio station from Koper with pop music	

== Radio stations no longer on the air ==
Stations	Date when broadcasts stopped	Station that replaced the previous radio channel on the same frequencies
Poslovni val (Slovenski poslovni kanal)	11 April 2007	Radio 1
Radio Bakla	May 2008	Radio 1, later Rock Celje
Turistični radio Potepuh	?	?
Radio Plus	2010	Radio Bit
Notranjski radio Logatec (NTR)	?	Radio 94
Radio Bit	9 November 2011	Radio Top
Radio Gama MM	3 April 2006	Radio Ekspres
Radio Fantasy	1 January 2012	Radio Antena
Radio Geoss	16 February 2008	Radio 1
Radio glas Ljubljane	31 December 2007	Radio Aktual
Radio Hrvatini	31 December 2007	Radio Tartini
Celjski val	?	Radio 1
Radio Klasik	31 December 2007	Radio 1
Radio Max	18 April 2007	Radio 1
Radio Morje	18 April 2007	Radio 1
Radio Portorož	18 April 2007	Radio 1
Radio Sevnica	2007	Radio Veseljak
Radio Brežice	3 January 2008	Radio Aktual, later Radio Veseljak
Radio Šport	11 April 2007	Radio 1
Radio Val (Sežana)	18 April 2007	Radio 1
Radio Tempo	1 May 2010	Radio Center
Radio Radlje	15 February 2010	Radio 1
Radio Orion	16 June 2008	Radio 1
Radio Energy	1 October 2008	Radio Center
Radio Urban	15 June 2009	Radio 1
Radio Odeon	2 February 2009	Radio 1
Radio Dur	4 May 2011	Radio Pacient
Radio Pacient	1 December 2012	Radio Center, from 8 September 2014 Rock Radio
Radio Viva	16 April 2012	Radio 1
Radio Grom	19 March 2012	Radio 1
Studio D	11 January 2012	Radio Aktual
Radio Nova	12 April 2012	Radio Center
Radio Snoopy	12 April 2012	Radio Center
Radio Goldi	12 April 2012	Radio 1
Radio Ljubljana	October 2012	Radio S
Radio Belvi	1 January 2012	Radio Antena
Radio Tartini	2011	Radio Aktual
Radio Kum	3 November 2014	Radio Aktual
Radio Radio	30 January 2015	Radio 1
Radio Alfa	20 January 2014	Radio Center
Radio S	23 November 2015	Radio 2
Radio Antena Gorenjska	1 February 2016	Radio 1
Radio Antena Maribor	17 January 2016	Rock Maribor
Radio Europa 05	17 October 2016	Radio Bob
Radio Top	17 January 2016	Rock Radio
Radio Antena Štajerska	3 January 2018	Radio Fantasy
Radio Laser	4 June 2019	
Radio Velenje	31 December 2021	Radio Veseljak
Radio Brezje	April 2022	Radio Veseljak
Radio Salomon (stopped FM transmissions; can be listened to via DAB+)	11 November 2022	Best FM
Odprti radio	25 November 2022	Radio Salomon
Radio 2	23 January 2023	Radio 1 80-a
Rock Celje	1 June 2023	Best FM
Radio Pohorje	11 March 2024	Best FM
Radio Bob	11 November 2024	Radio 1 Rock
Rock Maribor	11 November 2024	Radio 1 Rock
