= Benka Pulko =

Slovenian motorcycle rider and journalist

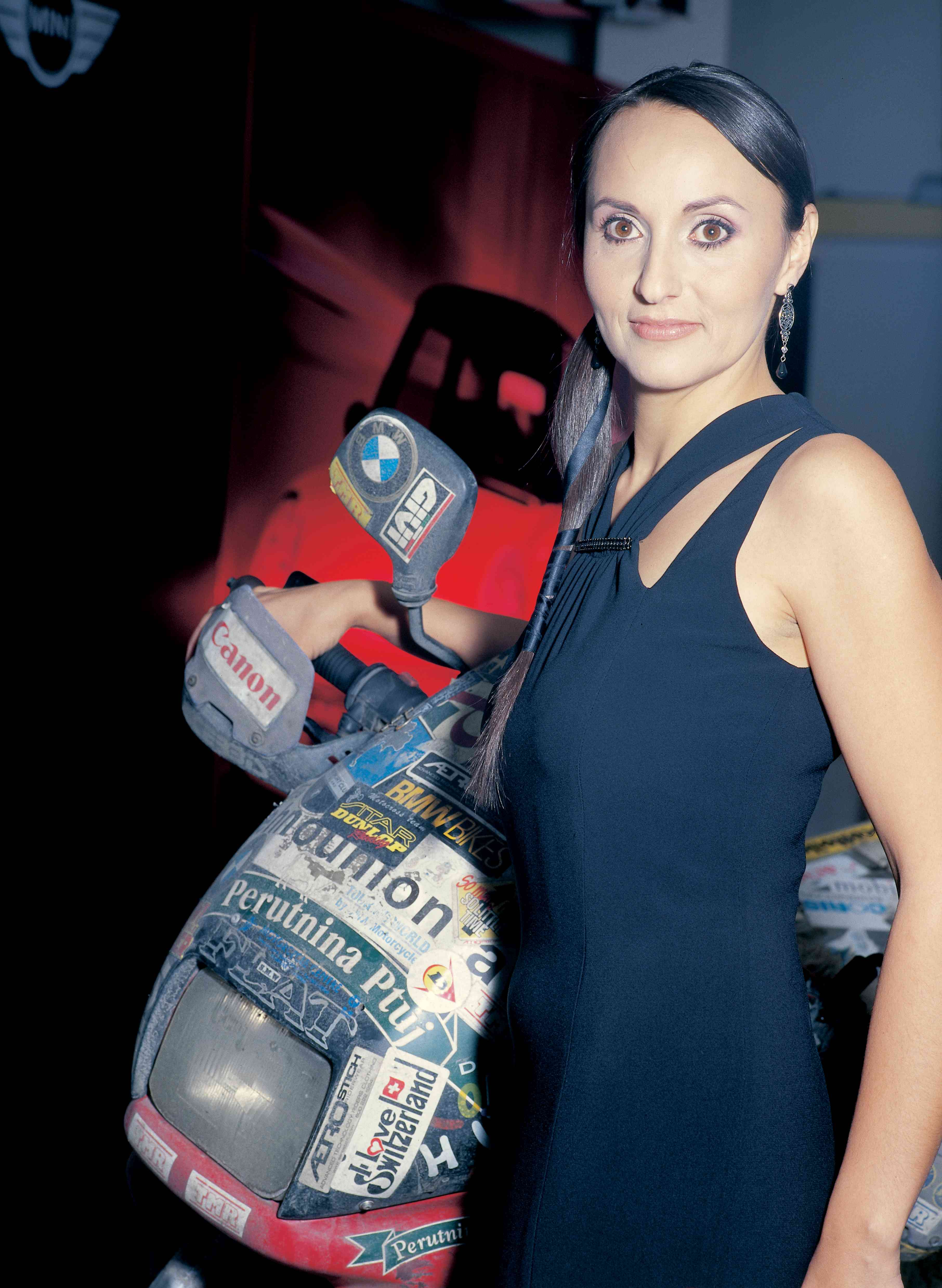
- Benka Pulko (2003)
- Born: 15 May 1967 (age 59); Ptuj, SR Slovenia, SFR Yugoslavia
- Citizenship: Slovenian
- Spouse: Keith Carr
- Writing career
- Notable awards: Slovenian Woman of the Year 2003
- Website: www.benkapulko.com

Benka Pulko (born 15 May 1967) is a Slovenian world traveler, Guinness World Record holder, author and photographer. Between 1997 and 2002, she embarked on a motorcycle trip across all seven continents, achieving multiple world records and firsts. During her trip, she engaged in photography and travel writing, and she became involved in humanitarian work to support Tibetan diaspora in India.

== Biography ==
Pulko has a university degree in biology, and specialized training in massage therapy, and is a former educator. She gained media attention for traveling to all seven continents on her motorcycle. On 19 June 1997 Benka Pulko departed from her hometown of Ptuj, Slovenia on a BMW F650 motorcycle. She returned to Ptuj on 10 December 2002, having established a Guinness World Record for the longest solo motorcycle ride ever undertaken by a woman - in both distance, 111,856 miles (180,015 km), and duration, 2,000 days. In the process she also became the first motorcyclist to reach all seven continents, and the first woman to ride solo across Saudi Arabia. The most challenging aspect was to reach Antarctica, requiring hitching a ride on a sightseeing boat from Ushuaia, Argentina.

After returning to her home, Pulko was chosen as Slovenian Woman of the Year for 2003 by readers of Jana, Slovenia's oldest women's magazine.

== Work ==
=== Journalism ===
In addition to being an adventurer, Pulko has extensive experience as a journalist, with her articles having appeared in approximately 50 publications in New Zealand, South Africa, United Arab Emirates, Japan and the United States. In Slovenia, she continues to be a regular contributor to national magazines and newspapers such as Jana, Delo, Dnevnik, Večer, 7D, Primorske novice, Štajerski tednik and others.

=== Photography ===
During her record-setting journey, Pulko began photographing the people and places she experienced. Since her return, she has presented these photographs in more than 40 solo exhibitions.

=== Literature ===
Pulko's first book, Po Zemlji okoli Sonca (Around the World Circling the Sun), a large format book chronicling her journey in photos and words, became the fastest selling coffee table book in Slovenian history. At the 19th National Book Fair in Ljubljana, it took home the top prize for Best Overall Publication, as well as the award for Prepress.

In 2005, Pulko provided the cover photo and co-authored the book Biseri sveta v očeh slovenskih popotnikov (Jewels of the World) along with other Slovene adventurists like Zvone Šeruga and Arne Hodalić.

Obrazi sveta / Faces of the World is an exhibition catalog, in both English and Slovene, detailing her photo exhibition of the same name.

Pulko's most successful book to date, Pocestnica was also published in 2007. At the book's launch the President of Slovenia Danilo Türk, Mayor of Slovenia's capital, Zoran Janković and other celebrities presented excerpts to the audience.

Dve ciklami ali Na svetu je dovolj prostora za vse ("Two Sour Flowers or There is Enough Room for Everyone") marks Pulko's first foray into children's literature. The book was awarded at the International Children's Literature Competition in Schwanenstadt, Austria.

Otroci sveta (Children of the World) is a collaboration with well-known Slovene young adult literature author Janja Vidmar.

=== Humanitarian activity ===
While traveling through Dharamsala, India, Pulko was moved by the plight of the children of the Tibetan diaspora. As a result, she launched the humanitarian organization "Believe in Yourself and Kickstart the World". The primary goal of the foundation is to promote, encourage, and support the education of children with limited opportunities in different parts of the world. The organization primarily focuses on providing scholarships to students of Tibetan Children's Village, and ensuring female students have equal educational opportunity.

=== Documentaries ===
Black and White Rainbow or Črno - bela mavrica (2009), recorded in both English and Slovene languages, presents a glimpse into the life of the exiled Tibetan community. It complements Pulko's similarly named exhibition, which includes hand painted Buddhist mandalas.

Others Before Self / Drugi pred menoj (2013), focuses on the educational and social philosophy behind the Tibetan Children's Village system of schools. The film includes Pulko's interview with the 14th Dalai Lama.

== Works ==
- Po Zemlji okoli Sonca (UndaraStudio, coffee table travel book, Slovene language, 2003);
- Biseri sveta v očeh slovenskih popotnikov (Mladinska knjiga, co-author, coffee table travel book, Slovene language, 2005);
- Obrazi sveta / Faces of the World (UndaraStudio, photo catalogue, Slovene/English language, 2007);
- Pocestnica (UndaraStudio, autobiography, Slovene language, 2007);
- Dve ciklami ali Na svetu je dovolj prostora za vse (UndaraStudio, children's book, Slovene language, 2009);
- Two Sour Flowers or There is Enough Room for Everyone (UndaraStudio, children's book, English language, 2011);
- Circling the Sun (UndaraStudio, coffee table travel book, English language, 2011);
- Kickstart - Als Frau solo mit dem Motorrad um die Welt (Malik National Geographic, autobiography, German language, 2012);
- 5,5: jedna žena, jedan motor, sedam kontinenata (Globtroter Bečkerek, autobiography, Serbian language, 2012);
- Children of the World (UndaraStudio, co-author with Janja Vidmar, young-adult literature, Slovene language, 2013).
