= Finance (disambiguation) =

Finance is the study of businesses and investments.

It may also refer to:

- Finance (game), a board game
- Finance (newspaper), a Slovenian newspaper
- Finance (constituency), a Hong Kong constituency
- Financing, a short term lease granting right-of-use of an asset similar to rent-to-own schemes
