= Soccer Iraq =

- Website type: Sports journalism Social media agency
- Available in: English
- Launched: 2015

Soccer Iraq is an English-language Iraqi news and social media agency providing a variety of news, statistics and services for Iraqi football, ranging from coverage on the Iraq national football team and its players to news on the Iraq Stars League.

On 17 May 2021, Soccer Iraq partnered with Al-Shorta Sports Club to manage the club's official English-language social media profiles. On 17 May 2023, Soccer Iraq reached an agreement with the Iraq Football Association (IFA) to launch and administer new social media channels for the Iraq national football team.

== History ==
Soccer Iraq launched on 11 March 2015 with the aim of creating an English-based website covering Iraq's national football team, the Lions of Mesopotamia, as well as the domestic club competitions and the nation's foreign-based players. In 2017, Soccer Iraq assisted the Iraq Football Association (IFA) in the process of verifying the IFA's official social media profiles. In 2020, Soccer Iraq helped facilitate Safaa Hadi's move to the Russian Premier League by streamlining the communication of the Russian Football Union and PFC Krylia Sovetov with Al-Shorta SC regarding the completion of administrative procedures.

Soccer Iraq has also been involved in research into the earliest league and cup tournaments played in Iraq. Several current and former international players have regularly interacted with the website's posts on social media. The website published several interviews since its launch – most recently with Gonzalo Rodríguez García, Osama Rashid, Mohannad Abdul-Raheem, Rebin Sulaka, Lorival Santos, Marin Ion, Justin Meram and Ali Adnan.

== Providing Information ==
Throughout the years, Soccer Iraq has provided information regarding the Iraqi game to many major news networks and has been relied on by news organisations around the world, such as International Business Times, La Gazzetta dello Sport, Marca, L'Equipe, Goal, Al Jazeera, ESPN FC, Asian Football Confederation, Diario AS, Daily Mail, Daily Express, Sport.ro, Major League Soccer, Panorama, Mundo Deportivo, The Washington Post, The National, Fox Sports, Transfermarkt, RT, Emarat Al Youm, 90min.com, SPORTbible, Vancouver Whitecaps FC, Tuttosport, Sportskeeda, Football Manager, Telemundo Deportes, Het Nieuwsblad, Corriere dello Sport, Le Matin, Index.hr, Bola, Sport1, L'essentiel, Vanity Fair, NOS, Algemeen Dagblad, Thanh Niên, Siol, La Nación, NRC Handelsblad, Cumhuriyet, Al Akhbar, Radiotelevizija Slovenija, Kurir, El Comercio, La República, El Liberal, La Prensa, Koran Sindo, Žurnal24, DV, The New Arab, TyC Sports, Nova Sport 1, HobbyConsolas and Kurdistan 24.

== Partnerships ==
On 17 May 2021, Iraqi club Al-Shorta SC announced on its official website that it had partnered with Soccer Iraq to manage its English-language social media profiles and streamline its digital content across all accounts. The move came after Al-Shorta's participation in Asia's top club competition, the AFC Champions League, with the club appointing Soccer Iraq due to its "six years of experience in social media and digital marketing". On 29 June 2021, Al-Shorta became the first Iraqi club to receive Twitter verification, through its English-language account.

On 17 May 2023, Soccer Iraq reached an agreement with the Iraq Football Association (IFA) to launch and manage official English-language social media channels for the Iraq national football team, with the IFA commending the distinctive style of Soccer Iraq's body of work in digital media and its pioneering of English-language coverage of football in the country. These were later transformed to become the official channels for the national team in both English and Arabic.

== Player of the Year ==
Soccer Iraq launched an Iraq Player of the Year award for the first time in 2021. Mohammed Qasim Majid won the inaugural award and was congratulated by his club.

| Year | Rank | Player | Position | Points (%) |
|---|---|---|---|---|
| 2021 | 1st | Mohammed Qasim | Midfielder | 59.4 |
| 2021 | 2nd | Fahad Talib | Goalkeeper | 19.6 |
| 2021 | 3rd | Ahmed Ibrahim | Defender | 10.6 |
| 2022 | 1st | Jalal Hassan | Goalkeeper | 52.2 |
| 2022 | 2nd | Aymen Hussein | Forward | 30.2 |
| 2022 | 3rd | Munaf Younis | Defender | 9.0 |
| 2023 | 1st | Ibrahim Bayesh | Midfielder | 42.9 |
| 2023 | 2nd | Ali Al-Hamadi | Forward | 38.2 |
| 2023 | 3rd | Merchas Doski | Defender | 5.0 |
| 2024 | 1st | Aymen Hussein | Forward | 34.5 |
| 2024 | 2nd | Zidane Iqbal | Midfielder | 27.2 |
| 2024 | 3rd | Ali Jasim | Forward | 14.0 |
| 2025 | 1st | Mohanad Ali | Forward | 38.9 |
| 2025 | 2nd | Jalal Hassan | Goalkeeper | 27.8 |
| 2025 | 3rd | Amir Al-Ammari | Midfielder | 16.7 |

== Goal of the Season ==
Soccer Iraq launched the first ever Goal of the Season competition for the Iraqi Premier League starting from the 2016–17 season. Al-Zawraa midfielder Ali Raheem won the award in both of its first two seasons. The award lasted for six seasons until it was succeeded by the "Iraq Stars League Goal of the Season" award from the 2023–24 season.

| Season | Scorer | Nationality | For | Against | Stadium | Date |
|---|---|---|---|---|---|---|
| 2016–17 | Ali Raheem | Iraq | Al-Zawraa | Al-Shorta | Al-Shaab Stadium | 10 May 2017 |
| 2017–18 | Ali Raheem | Iraq | Al-Zawraa | Al-Hussein | Al-Shaab Stadium | 30 May 2018 |
| 2018–19 | Mohanad Ali | Iraq | Al-Shorta | Al-Naft | Al-Shaab Stadium | 4 March 2019 |
| 2019–20 | Saad Abdul-Amir | Iraq | Al-Shorta | Al-Minaa | Al-Shaab Stadium | 7 March 2020 |
| 2020–21 | Joseph Nathaniel | Nigeria | Al-Hudood | Al-Quwa Al-Jawiya | Al-Shaab Stadium | 13 February 2021 |
| 2021–22 | Alaa Abbas | Iraq | Al-Quwa Al-Jawiya | Al-Karkh | Al-Shaab Stadium | 20 October 2021 |

== Team of the Decade ==
In late 2019, Soccer Iraq commemorated the end of the 2010s with the Soccer Iraq Team of the Decade which was voted for by fans over a two-month period via a series of Twitter polls. After several thousands of votes, 28 players were narrowed down to the final eleven and the team was revealed on 31 December 2019. The selection of Mohanad Ali in the Team of the Decade was discussed by the official Asian Football Confederation broadcast during Iraq's match with Iran in 2022 FIFA World Cup qualifiers.

2010–2019

| Goalkeeper | Defenders | Midfielders | Forwards |
|---|---|---|---|
| Noor Sabri | Ali Adnan; Ahmed Ibrahim; Ali Rehema; Alaa Mhawi | Hawar Mulla Mohammed; Nashat Akram; Saad Abdul-Amir; Humam Tariq | Younis Mahmoud; Mohanad Ali |
