= Jalal Hassan =

Iraqi footballer

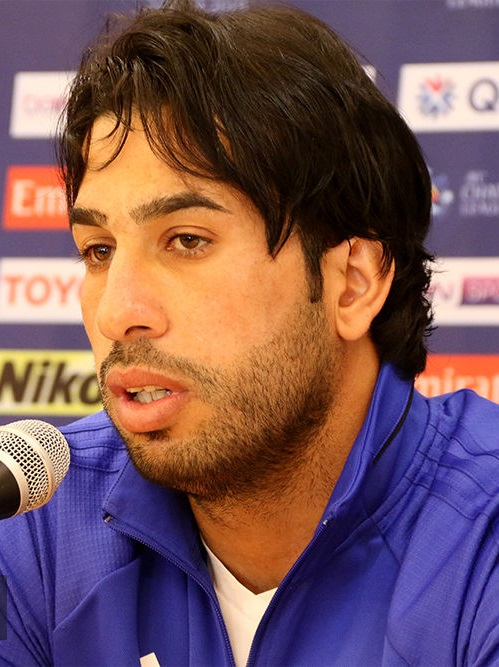
- Jalal Hassan in 2019

Personal information
- Full name: Jalal Hassan Hachem
- Date of birth: 18 May 1991 (age 35)
- Place of birth: Al Diwaniyah, Iraq
- Height: 1.88 m (6 ft 2 in)
- Position: Goalkeeper

Team information
- Current team: Al-Shorta
- Number: 12

Senior career*
Years	Team	Apps	(Gls)
2009–2012	Karbala	49	(0)
2012–2014	Erbil	50	(0)
2014–2015	Amanat Baghdad		(0)
2015–2016	Al-Shorta		(0)
2016–2017	Naft Al-Wasat		(0)
2017–2026	Al-Zawraa		(0)
2026–	Al-Shorta		

International career^{‡}
2009–2010	Iraq U20	3	(0)
2011–2014	Iraq U23	8	(0)
2011–	Iraq	104	(0)
- * Club domestic league appearances and goals as of 4 July 2026 ‡ National team caps and goals as of 26 June 2026

Jalal Hassan Hachem (Arabic: جَلَال حَسَن هَاشِم; born 18 May 1991) is an Iraqi professional footballer who plays as a goalkeeper for Al-Shorta and captains the Iraq national team.

Jalal is the captain of the Iraqi national team, and has been the starting goalkeeper for the majority of the past decade. He is the only Iraqi goalkeeper to claim the starting position in three consecutive Asian Cup campaigns. He led the team to victory in the 25th Arabian Gulf Cup on home soil, ending Iraq's 35-year wait for the trophy.

== Club career ==
=== Early career ===
Jalal started his career with Karbala where he spent three season before moving to Kurdish side Erbil. He was scouted by Hisham Dawood

=== Erbil SC ===
Jalal joined Erbil SC in 2012, where he was mainly a 2nd choice goalkeeper with the club. A few months into his tenure with Erbil, his team reached the final of the 2012 AFC Cup, where he was an unused substitute in the final as his team lost 4–0. That same season, Erbil finished in 2nd place, two points behind the champions AL-Shorta. The following season, Erbil reached the final of the AFC Cup, before losing against Qadsia SC on penalties, Erbil were in second place when the league was ended prematurely due to the conflict in the country at the time.

=== Amanat Baghdad ===
Jalal moved to the capital Baghdad, ahead of the 2015 Asian Cup. He played the second half of the season as his team finished in 6th position in the league.

=== Al Shorta ===
Hassan joined Iraqi giants Al-Shorta for a short-lived stint in 2015. He missed two weeks of the campaign due to First degree burns sustained in the shower. Following his return from injury, Hassan claimed the starting spot in the squad, as the team finished 7th in the league. He left the team at the end of the season due to the incoming signing of Noor Sabri, saying that "Al Shorta does not have the space for two great goalkeepers"

=== Naft Al Wasat ===
In the summer of 2016 Hassan joined Naft-Al Wasat on a free transfer where he was the starting goalkeeper for the Najaf based club. He spent one season with the team as they finished in 5th position before leaving at the end of the season.

=== Al-Zawra'a ===
==== 2017–2020 ====
In 2017, Hassan returned to Baghdad, this time joining Al-Zawra'a. He made his debut in the 2017 Iraqi Super Cup, leading Al-Zawraa to a victory over rivals Al Quwa Al Jawiya by saving two penalties in the shootout. He suffered a minor injury during the Arabian Gulf Cup with Iraq that kept him out for two weeks. Hassan reclaimed his starting spot after his return from injury, and helped the team to win a record-extending 14th league title. Their domestic triumph meant that the team qualified to the 2019 AFC Champions League.

In the 2018–19 season Al-Zawra'a failed to retain their title, as they finished third in the table, they also failed to get out of the group in the AFC Champions League, finishing 3rd with eight points in Group A. Al-Zawra'a had a silver lining in the last match of the season, beating Al-Kahrabaa to win the Iraqi FA Cup. Their win meant that the club would enter the preliminary round of the Asian Champions League.

Hassan remained with the side for the 2019–2020 season, the team started the season on the wrong foot, after being eliminated from the preliminary round of the 2019–20 Arab Club Champions Cup. In the September of the 2019 season, Hassan suffered an injury during a national team training camp ahead of the World Cup qualifying match against Bahrain. He was out of action for 6 weeks, and returned to training in October. The season was interrupted in late September and suspended indefinitely in October due to the 2019 Iraqi protests. In January 2020, Jalal started for Al-Zawra'a as they were eliminated from the Asian Champions League Playoff round in a 4–1 defeat to FC Bunyodkor of Uzbekistan. The league resumed in March 2020, only to be cancelled and annulled due to the COVID-19 pandemic. In November 2020, Hassan himself tested positive for COVID-19.

==== 2020–present ====
Due to the cancellation of the previous season's results, Al Zawra'a entered the Asian Champions League at the same stage as last season, once again failing to qualify to the group stage following a 2–1 defeat with UAE side Al Wahda FC where Hassan played all 90 minutes. Al-Zawra'a came close to the 2020-2021 league title, but finished second behind local rivals Al Quwa Al Jawiya, falling short by 8 points. His team also reached the final of the FA Cup to face the same opponent, but he missed the match due to injury; Al-Zawra'a ended up losing the match on penalties. However, due to being runner up in both tournaments, they received a place in the Champions League playoff for the third season running. Jalal's performances in the season led him to being voted as the best goalkeeper in Iraq.

In 2021–2022, Al-Zawra'a had one of their worst years in recent memory. The season started out strong for Al-Zawra'a, who won the 2021 Iraqi Super Cup, however Jalal was still recovering from injury and was not part of the squad. The club finished 6th in the domestic league, and were knocked out in the semi final of the Iraq FA Cup under the management of Essam Hamad who was sacked in December. Haidar Abdul-Amir was the caretaker manager but after 1 win in 5 games he too was replaced, this time with Ayoub Odisho. Due to the re-shuffling of the Asian calendar, Al-Zawra'a did not play Asian competitions until March 2022. The club failed to qualify to the Champions League proper, after losing to UAE side Al Sharjah SC on penalties in the playoff round, where Jalal was sent off in the match. He won the Soccer Iraq Player of the Year award at the end of the 2022 calendar year due to his performances with the national team.

Ahead of the 2022–23 season, Hassan renewed his contract with Al-Zawra'a to remain for another season, and was reportedly earning the equivalent of US$150,000 per season. The club had an improvement the following season, finishing 3rd in the league with 68 points and earning a spot in the 2023–24 AFC Cup, however the club once again failed to win the FA Cup, losing to Al Jawiya on penalties in the quarter final. Jalal won the Soccer Star Goalkeeper of the Year for the second time due to his performances in the season. He also won the award for best goalkeeper in the Gulf region for his performances that season, as voted on by Sky News Arabia.

In September 2023, Hassan extended his contract to remain for a 7th season with the club. Hassan's suspension from his last continental club match carried over across tournaments and he missed the opening match of the AFC Cup against Al-Arabi of Kuwait. The team had a disappointing tournament, exiting from the group stage after finishing runners up in Group B to eventual champions Al Ahed FC. He suffered an ankle injury in April which kept him out of the side for two months before returning ahead of the match against Al-Hedood. Al-Zawra'a once again lost against Al Jawiya in the FA Cup, this time in the Semi Final, and finished 3rd in the league in a repeat of their result from last season.

Jalal Hassan remained with Al-Zawra'a for his 8th consecutive season with the club, ahead of the 2024–25 season.

== International career ==
Hassan was called up to the Iraqi national team for the first time in 2011 ahead of a friendly match against Uganda.

Hassan was called up to the 21st Arabian Gulf Cup in 2013 that was held in Bahrain. He was an unused substitute in the tournament as Iraq reached the final before losing against the United Arab Emirates in extra time.

Jalal was called up to the Iraqi squad in the 2015 Asian Cup, he started all the matches as Iraq reached the Semi Final, but lost 2–0 against South Korea. Iraqi GK coach Emad Hashim refused to blame Hassan for the goals that were conceded in the semi final, saying that "the goals were due to a combination of mistakes between the goalkeeper and defensive line." Hassan did not take part in the 3rd and 4th place match, which Iraq lost.

In the next international break, former goalkeeper Noor Sabri returned to the national team following a two-year absence. Despite his position as the number 1 in the team being put under threat, Hassan claimed that "he welcomes the return of Noor Sabri to the squad."

Hassan was called up to the Iraqi squad in 2017 for 23rd Arabian Gulf Cup, held in Kuwait. He started all 4 matches as Iraq were knocked out in the semi final of the tournament against the UAE on penalties.

Hassan was called up to the Iraqi squad for the 2019 Asian Cup. He was the first goalkeeper in Iraq's history to start back to back major tournaments. Iraq were knocked out in the round of 16 against Qatar, in a match where Hassan was heavily criticized for his performance. He was also called up to the 24th Arabian Gulf Cup, where Iraq lost in the semi final against Bahrain.

Hassan was called up to the Iraqi squad in the 25th Arabian Gulf Cup on home soil. Hassan started all 5 matches in the tournament as captain. He saved a penalty kick in the 82nd minute of the final against Oman, however he conceded another penalty in the final moments of regular time, Iraq went on to win 3–2 in the final as Iraq went on to win the title, their first since 1988.

Hassan continued to be number 1 under Jesús Casas extending his record to be the only Iraqi goalkeeper to start three consecutive Asian Cup tournaments when he was called up to the squad as captain ahead of the 2023 Asian Cup. Iraq lost in the round of 16 once again, in a controversial match against Jordan which saw Iraq's talisman Aymen Hussein sent off for receiving a second yellow card for his celebration. Hassan received a US$10,000 fine for his comments on the referee after the match.

On 18 November 2025, Hassan made his 100th international appearance in a 2–1 victory over the United Arab Emirates during the 2026 FIFA World Cup qualification, which secured a place in the inter-confederation play-offs.

== Style of play ==
Hassan is known for his bravery, often putting his body on the line in order to prevent the opponent from scoring, as well as going out to claim crosses in an aggressive manner. His former manager Basim Qasim has described him as a "brave goalkeeper, who must continue to be brave in order to remain the goalkeeper of the national team."

== Personal life ==
Jalal Hassan got married in 2019. He has two children, one son and one daughter.

His favorite goalkeeper is Italian legend Gianluigi Buffon and his favorite food is masgouf. He considers Ahmed Ibrahim Khalaf to be one of his closest friends.

He faced a wave of criticism in 2019 following Iraq's defeat in the Asian Cup, where many fans thought he was responsible for the goal conceded by Iraq in their round of 16 defeat against Qatar. This criticism continued for months following the tournament.

Several key players such as Mohanad Ali and Mohammed Gassid as well as media personalities came out in support of Hassan both through TV programs and social media. However others, most notably Iraq's all-time most capped player Younis Mahmoud criticized Hassan for the way he handled the issue, saying that "the national team captain should not allow himself to get affected by the words published online."

Due to his position as captain of one of Iraq's biggest clubs and its national team, Hassan has appeared in a number of commercials in Iraq. He appeared in numerous commercials for Iraqi Telecom company Earthlink, as well as real estate company Esrar.

== Career statistics ==
As of match played 26 June 2026

Appearances and goals by national team and year
National team	Year	Apps	Goals
Iraq	2011	1	0
Iraq	2012	5	0
Iraq	2013	2	0
Iraq	2014	8	0
Iraq	2015	9	0
Iraq	2016	5	0
Iraq	2017	5	0
Iraq	2018	8	0
Iraq	2019	12	0
Iraq	2020	1	0
Iraq	2021	6	0
Iraq	2022	7	0
Iraq	2023	9	0
Iraq	2024	15	0
Iraq	2025	7	0
Iraq	2026	4	0
Total		104	0

== Honors ==
Al-Zawraa

- Iraqi Premier League: 2017–18
- Iraq FA Cup: 2018–19
- Iraqi Super Cup: 2017

Iraq

- Arabian Gulf Cup: 2023

Individual

- Soccer Star Iraqi Goalkeeper of the year: 2021–2022, 2022–2023
- Soccer Iraq Player of the Year: 2022
- Sky News Arabia Best Goalkeeper in the Gulf region of the year: 2023
