= 2003 Slovenian privatisation referendum =

A referendum on privatisation was held in Slovenia on 19 January 2003. Voters were asked whether Slovenian Railways should be kept as a single company during the privatisation process and whether subscribers to Telekom Slovenije should receive a rebate for the above market price fees paid for cable TV prior to privatisation. The railways question was rejected by 51.9% of voters, whilst the Telekom proposal was approved by 77.6% of voters. Voter turnout was only 31%.

== Results ==
=== Slovenian Railways ===
| Choice | Votes | % |
|---|---|---|
| For | 236,534 | 48.1 |
| Against | 254,904 | 51.9 |
| Invalid/blank votes | 9,991 | – |
| Total | 501,429 | 100 |
| Registered voters/turnout | 1,610,180 | 31.1 |
Source: Nohlen & Stöver

=== Telekom Slovenije ===
| Choice | Votes | % |
|---|---|---|
| For | 384,925 | 77.6 |
| Against | 111,143 | 22.4 |
| Invalid/blank votes | 5,664 | – |
| Total | 501,732 | 100 |
| Registered voters/turnout | 1,610,180 | 31.2 |
Source: Nohlen & Stöver
