= Eufeeds =

Eufeeds.com is the biggest RSS aggregator that provides direct RSS news from more than 1000 European newspapers, press agencies and magazines.

== Overview ==
Eufeeds.com was founded in 2010 by the European Journalism Centre of Maastricht.

The website is updated every 20 minutes and it covers 27 European Union countries with the most popular national, regional and local newspapers (there is also a special page dedicated to news about Europe).
