= Primož Karpe =

Primoz Karpe (born 1970) is the chairman of the Supervisory Board of Nova Ljubljanska Banka (NLB) since 2016.

== Early life and education ==
Karpe was born in 1970 in Slovenia. He earned an undergraduate degree in economics, specializing in finance, from the University of Ljubljana's Faculty of Economics. He then obtained a Master of Science degree in business administration with a specialization in finance from San Diego State University.

== Career ==
After early roles in asset–liability management at SKB Bank and business development work at Telekom Slovenije, Karpe moved into corporate finance, heading mergers and acquisitions at Publikum Korpfin (2007–2008). He co-founded the advisory firm Vafer Ltd. (2008–2010) and in 2011 became a founding partner of Blue Sea Capital, a Luxembourg-registered private-equity fund focused on counter-cyclical sectors in the Western Balkans, where he remained active until 2015. Since 2015 he has managed the Croatian investment company Angler d.o.o., and in 2020 he co-established Cedars d.o.o., which advises alternative-investment funds across Central and Southeast Europe. Karpe also serves as Investment Committee member for the largest private regional multi-class asset manager, ALFI Funds.

Karpe joined the NLB Supervisory Board in February 2016 and was elected its chairman the following month, succeeding Janko Gedrih. A second four-year mandate began in 2020, and in July 2024 the board re-elected him for a third term running to 2028. During his tenure, NLB completed an IPO in 2018, acquired regional banks (Komercijalna Banka Belgrade, SLS Leasing operations, Sberbank Slovenia), and accelerated digitalization.
