= List of libraries in Slovenia =

This is a list of libraries in Slovenia.

== Libraries by locale ==
=== Ljubljana ===
- Ljubljana City Library
- National and University Library of Slovenia
  - Digital Library of Slovenia
- Slovenian Academy of Sciences and Arts Library
- Slovenian Music Information Centre
- University of Ljubljana (see also: List of University of Ljubljana libraries (in Slovenian))
  - Central Economics Library, University of Ljubljana
  - Central Medical Library, Faculty of Medicine of the University of Ljubljana
  - Central Social Sciences Library Jože Goričar
  - Central Technical Library, University of Ljubljana

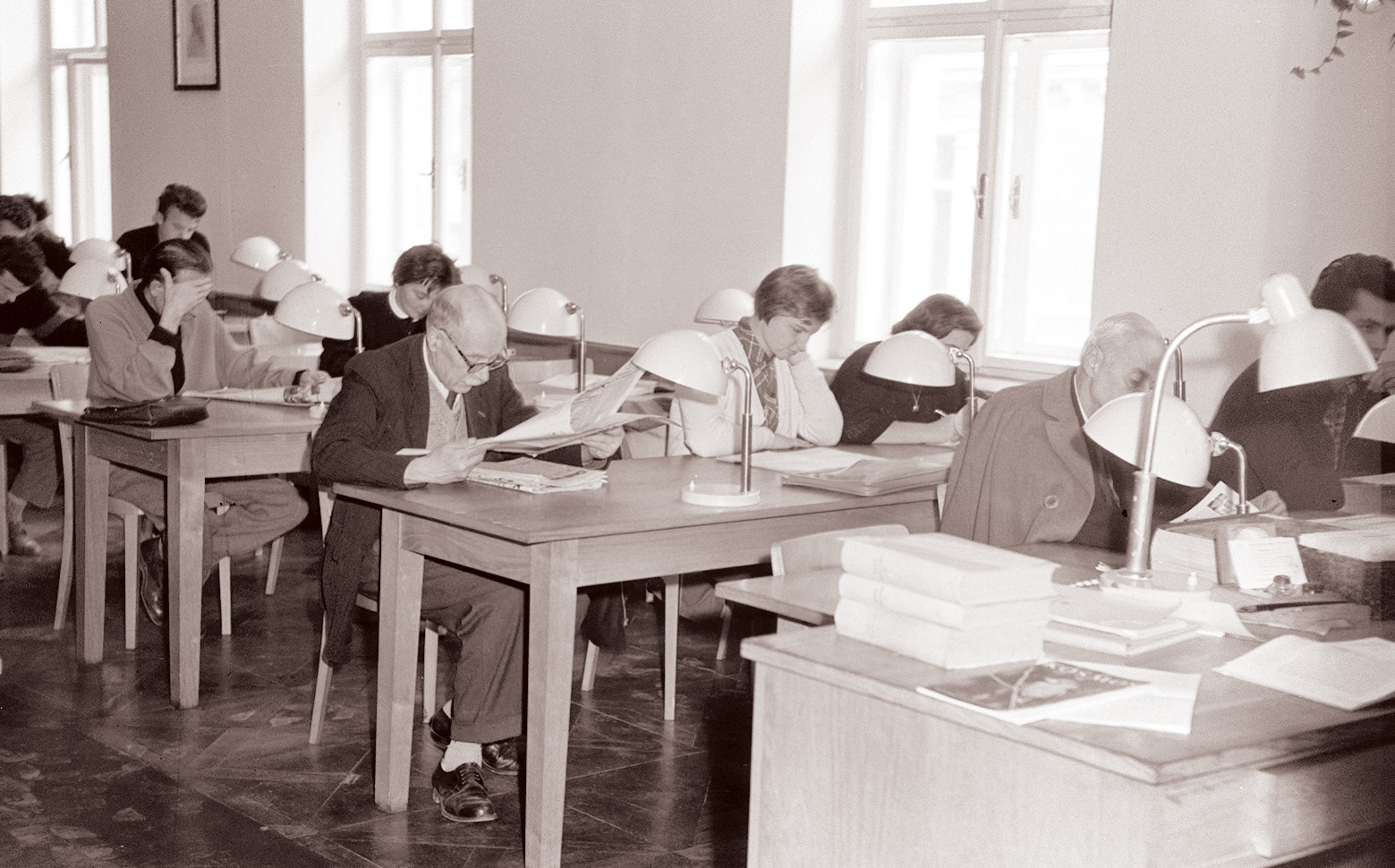
Interior of the Maribor University Library, Slovenia, Yugoslavia, 1960

=== Maribor ===
- Maribor Public Library
- Maribor University Library (see also: List of Maribor University libraries (in Slovenian))

=== Elsewhere ===
- Cankar's Library Vrhnika
- Celje Central Library
- Domžale Library
- Dr. Franc Sušnik Central Carinthian Library, Ravne na Koroškem
- France Bevk Public Library, Nova Gorica
- Ivan Potrč Library of Ptuj
- Izola Public Library
- Jesenice Municipal Library
- Kosovel Library Sežana
- Kranj City Library
- Litija library
- Logatec Library
- Miran Jarc Public Library in Novo mesto
- Murska Sobota Regional and Study Library
- Pavel Golia Library Trebnje
- Žalec Intermunicipal Public Library

== See also ==
- Access to public information in Slovenia
- COBISS (Co-operative Online Bibliographic System and Services), regional library network in Eastern Europe
- Legal deposit in Slovenia
- List of archives in Slovenia
- Mass media in Slovenia
- Slovenian literature

in Slovenian

- List of academic libraries in Slovenia (in Slovenian)
- List of monastery libraries in Slovenia (in Slovenian)
- List of public libraries in Slovenia (in Slovenian)
- List of Slovenian librarians (in Slovenian)
- Slovenian Library Association (in Slovenian)
