= Radio Center =

Radio Center may refer to:

- Radio Center (Slovenia), a national commercial radio station in Slovenia
- Radiocentre, the industry body for UK commercial radio
