= Access to public information in Slovenia =

Access to public information and freedom of information (FOI) refer to the right of access to information held by public bodies also known as "right to know". Access to public information is considered of fundamental importance for the effective functioning of democratic systems, as it enhances governments' and public officials' accountability, boosting people participation and allowing their informed participation into public life. The fundamental premise of the right of access to public information is that the information held by governmental institutions is in principle public and may be concealed only on the basis of legitimate reasons which should be detailed in the law.

In Slovenia, access to public information is guaranteed by Article 39 of the Constitution that protects freedom of speech and right of access to public information. The constitutional right of access to public information is embodied in the Access to Public Information Act adopted in 2004. In Slovenia everyone has the right to obtain information of a public nature in which he/she has a well grounded legal interest under the law, with the only exceptions provided by law. The Access to Public Information Act also enables every citizen to enjoy the right enshrined by Article 44 of the Constitution to actively participate in the management of public affairs.

== Legal framework ==
Slovenia has a good regulatory framework on access to public information. Slovenia's Access to Information Law is considered as one of the best in Europe.

Slovenian Constitution, adopted in 1991, for the first time legally defined a right to access to public information.

In Slovenia access to public information is regulated by the Access to Public Information Act (2004), the Decree on communication and re-use of information of a public nature (2005) and the decree amending it (2007), and the Information Commissioner Act (2005).

The aim of the Slovenian Access to Public Information Act is to ensure that the work of public bodies is open and transparent and to enable natural and legal entities to exercise their rights to obtain public information from public authorities holding such information. In order to achieve this aim, the law prescribes that public authorities have to obligation to inform the public about their work to the greatest extend possible.

The law defines the information to be considered as "public" stipulating that public information subject to access to information law refers to information and data originating from the field of work of public authorities, regardless of its form or origin.

Exceptions to the rule of disclosure are defined in Article 6 of the Law. Reasons for refusing can be due to the sensitive nature of the information requested, for instance information defined as classified pursuant the Act governing classified data, or information concerning personal data, or when disclosure of such information would prejudice the implementation of a judicial or administrative procedure.

Public authorities are obliged to provide access to information both to Slovenian and foreign nationals, including the foreign media. Relevant bodies have to make a decision on a FOI request within 20 business days: this term may be extended to a maximum of 30 business days in case of requests requiring a complex compilation of the documents sought. In case a response is not provided within the designed period of time the application is considered refused and the applicant may file a complaint with the Information Commissioner.

In 2005, the Information Commissioner Act established the institution of the Information Commissioner, an autonomous and independent body in charge of supervising the protection of personal data and the access to public information. The Commissioner is appointed by the National Assembly at the proposal of the President of the Republic.

== Access to public information in practice ==
When the right of access to public information was first introduced into the Constitution, most of Slovenians were not aware of this right. According to some experts, it took a decade for the right to be known, accepted and used by citizens of Slovenia. The right of access to public information is most widely used by journalists and NGOs, while citizens are requesting public information under the FOI law more and more frequently.

On the occasion of the International Right to Know Day celebrated on September 28, 2015, Information Commissioner Mojce Prelesnik highlighted that a key problem affecting the right of access to public information in Slovenia is the failure of state institutions to store certain data, which is particularly problematic in fields such as environmental protection, healthy food and consumer protection.

== See also ==
- Access to public information in Europe
- Freedom of information
- Freedom of information laws by country
- List of libraries in Slovenia
- Transparency of media ownership in Europe
- Media of Slovenia
- Transparency of media ownership in Slovenia
