= Mobitel (Slovenia) =

Slovenian telecommunications company

Mobitel, d.d.
- Type: Public
- Industry: Mobile telecommunications
- Founded: 1991
- Headquarters: Ljubljana, Slovenia
- Key people: Zoran Janko (Chief Executive Officer)
- Products: Mobile networks, Telecom services, Etc.
- Revenue: ▼410.2 million EUR (2009)

Mobitel was a Slovenian GSM/UMTS/LTE mobile operator. The company merged with Telekom Slovenije in 2013.

== History ==
Mobitel was established in October 1991 as a limited liability company. The founder was SP PTT Ljubljana, which was joined by other Slovenian PTT companies by the end of the year. In November 1992, Mobitel was transformed into a public limited company. In 1991, the company already set up the NMT analogue network for mobile telephony in Slovenia.

In 1994, PTT Slovenija separated postal and telecommunication activities and transferred the latter, together with the infrastructure, to the newly founded Telekom Slovenije, which became the owner of a 100-per-cent share of Mobitel.

In 1995, Mobitel became the national operator of digital mobile telecommunications by the decree of the Government of the Republic of Slovenia. By the summer of 1996, the company thus built the base of the GSM network. In 1996, the company also became a member of the international GSM Association, uniting GSM operators and GSM device manufacturers. The membership in the Association enabled the establishing of the first contracts on mutual roaming in foreign networks. By July 1996, the company provided a 40% GSM coverage of the population.

By 2000, 1,000,000 users used Mobitel services in the GSM and NMT networks. In November 2001, the company was the first in Slovenia to obtain a concession contract for UMTS – the third generation of mobile telecommunications.

In addition to telephony, the existing network also enabled a series of additional services. In 2001, the company introduced GPRS data transfer, in 2002 the network started supporting MMS multimedia messages, since 2003, network users had been able to access multimedia content on the mobile portal Planet and, in December 2003, Mobitel launched the UMTS third generation network, the first in the world. In 2008, the whole UMTS network was upgraded with the introduction of HSDPA and HSUPA technologies, also called 3.5 G. The company was in the process of upgrading its network with the HSPA+ technology.

In March 2013, Mobitel launched its LTE network on frequency 1800 MHz, covering 27 cities with 93 cell sites (37.25% of population), expanding its coverage to 31 cities (39.75% of population) in April. By the end of 2013, Mobitel estimated it would have 250 operational LTE cell sites.

In June 2014, Mobitel extended its LTE network by using the new awarded 800 MHz frequency.

In addition to the GSM/UMTS/LTE network, Mobitel also offered WLAN wireless internet access via the NeoWLAN network.

== Subsidiaries ==
- Soline, pridelava soli d.o.o. – salt-producing company founded in 2002, in charge of preserving the Sečovlje saltpans as an important part of Slovenian natural and cultural heritage and ensuring further development of Slovene traditional salt production.
- Planet 9 d.o.o. – founded in 2003. The company is in charge of ensuring advanced multimedia content for Mobitel's multimedia portals. Its services cover areas such as IPTV, online video, mobile solutions, web services, portals social networks, and other communication solutions.
- M-Pay d.o.o. – M-Pay was established in 2004, jointly by Mobitel and Nova KBM bank. The company was the leading provider of mobile payment for products and services in the Slovene market. The company ensured the functioning and expansion of the system of mobile payment Moneta.

== Mobitel network information ==
Mobitel covered 99.7% of Slovenian population with GSM, 91.42% with UMTS and 39.75% with LTE network.

== Mobitel services ==
Mobitel offered most of the services that the big operators provide in developed markets. They included:

- Planet – mobile and web portal with news, useful information and entertaining content that, in five years, developed into a medium in its own right
- Mobile e-mail: in addition to the global BlackBerry service, an even more affordable, in part, Mobitel's own solution, Integral
- M:Navigator – GPS navigation on the mobile phone with the download of maps via the GSM network
- Moneta – a service of mobile payment, with realizations for vending machines, POS terminals and internet shopping
- Mobile TV – following selected TV stations live on mobile phones, streamed via the 3G network. The basic station offer includes TV Slovenia 1 and 2, POP TV, Kanal A, Šport TV 1 and 2, Čarli TV, Info TV, Cartoon Network, Golica TV and TV Pika.
- M:Music – shopping for music directly on the mobile phone
- M:Rokovnik (M:Organiser) – creating a backup copy of contacts and the calendar
- M:Namiznik (M:Desktop) – a programme for sending SMS messages via a computer
- M4 – an overall offer of telecommunications services of internet, telephony, IP television and mobile telephony, in cooperation with Telekom Slovenije
- Družinska vez (Family Connection) – a comprehensive offer of telecommunication services for the entire family
- M:Certifikat (M:Certificate)
- M:Stik (M:Contact)
- M-Vrata (M-Doors)
