= Slovenske novice =

Slovene daily tabloid

- Type: Daily newspaper
- Format: Tabloid
- Owner: Delo company
- Publisher: Delo Publishing
- Founded: 1991; 35 years ago
- Language: Slovene
- Headquarters: Ljubljana
- Circulation: 31,000 (2024)
- Sister newspapers: Delo
- Website: www.slovenskenovice.si

Slovenske novice (lit. 'Slovenian News') is a Slovenian tabloid newspaper published in Slovenia. It is the first paper in its category.

== History and profile ==
Slovenske novice was first published in 1991 by the company Delo. The publisher of the paper is also Delo company. Its sister newspaper is Delo. Originally, Slovenske novice was published six times a week; since 1 March 2012, it is published also on Sundays. The paper is published in tabloid format.

Slovenske novice has the largest paid circulation among all daily newspapers in Slovenia. The 2003 circulation of the paper was 107,000 copies. Its 2007 circulation was 102,900 copies, making it the most read daily in the country. In the period between the last six months in 2009 and the first six months in 2010 the paper had a circulation of 305,000 copies.

== See also ==
- Mass media in Slovenia
- List of newspapers in Slovenia
