= Radio Aktual =

- Slovenia

Programming
- Language: Slovenian
- Format: popular music

History
- First air date: 2008

Links
- Website: radioaktual.si

Radio Aktual is a Slovenian radio station that has been broadcasting since 1 January 2008 on the frequencies of the former Radio Glas Ljubljane. The station primarily broadcasts Croatian popular music, along with a selection of regional and international hits, targeting a broad audience across Slovenia.

From January 2008 to August 2009, the main radio host of Radio Aktual was Matej Špehar – Racman, who was brought in by the station’s owners from Radio Hit, while most of the remaining team stayed from the former station.

== Audience ==
According to research by the Directorate for Media at the Ministry of Culture of the Republic of Slovenia, Radio Aktual was the fifth most-listened-to radio station in Slovenia in 2013. After Matej Špehar stepped down from his editorial role, the station adjusted its music programming format and became a 24-hour live radio service. Over the years, it consistently ranked among the top three radio stations, and in 2023 it surpassed 300,000 listeners, becoming the first radio station in Slovenia to reach this milestone.

== Ownership ==
The station operates under the Media 24 group, owned by Martin Odlazek. The group is known for its extensive media portfolio in Slovenia, including print, radio, and digital platforms.

== Television ==
Since 13 March 2023, a television channel titled Aktual TV has also been operating, broadcasting from Monday to Friday between 6:00 and 20:00. The channel complements the radio program with music, entertainment, and lifestyle content.

== Frequencies ==
Central Slovenia: 100.2 MHz

Styria: 104.8 MHz

Littoral: 102.4; 102.8; 98.4 and 92.6 MHz

Lower Carniola, Posavje, Bela Krajina (Aktual Studio D): 103.0 MHz

Zasavje (Aktual Kum): 98.1 MHz

DAB+: 215.072 MHz (MUX R1)
