= Radio Capris =

- Type: Radio network
- Country: Slovenia
- Availability: Slovenia, Triveneto, Worldwide
- Launch date: 1993
- Official website: http://www.radiocapris.si/

Radio Capris is a radio station located in the city of Koper, Slovenia. It can be heard from Slovenia and Triveneto on the frequency of 91.7 MHz.
