= Ahmed Ibrahim Khalaf =

Iraqi footballer

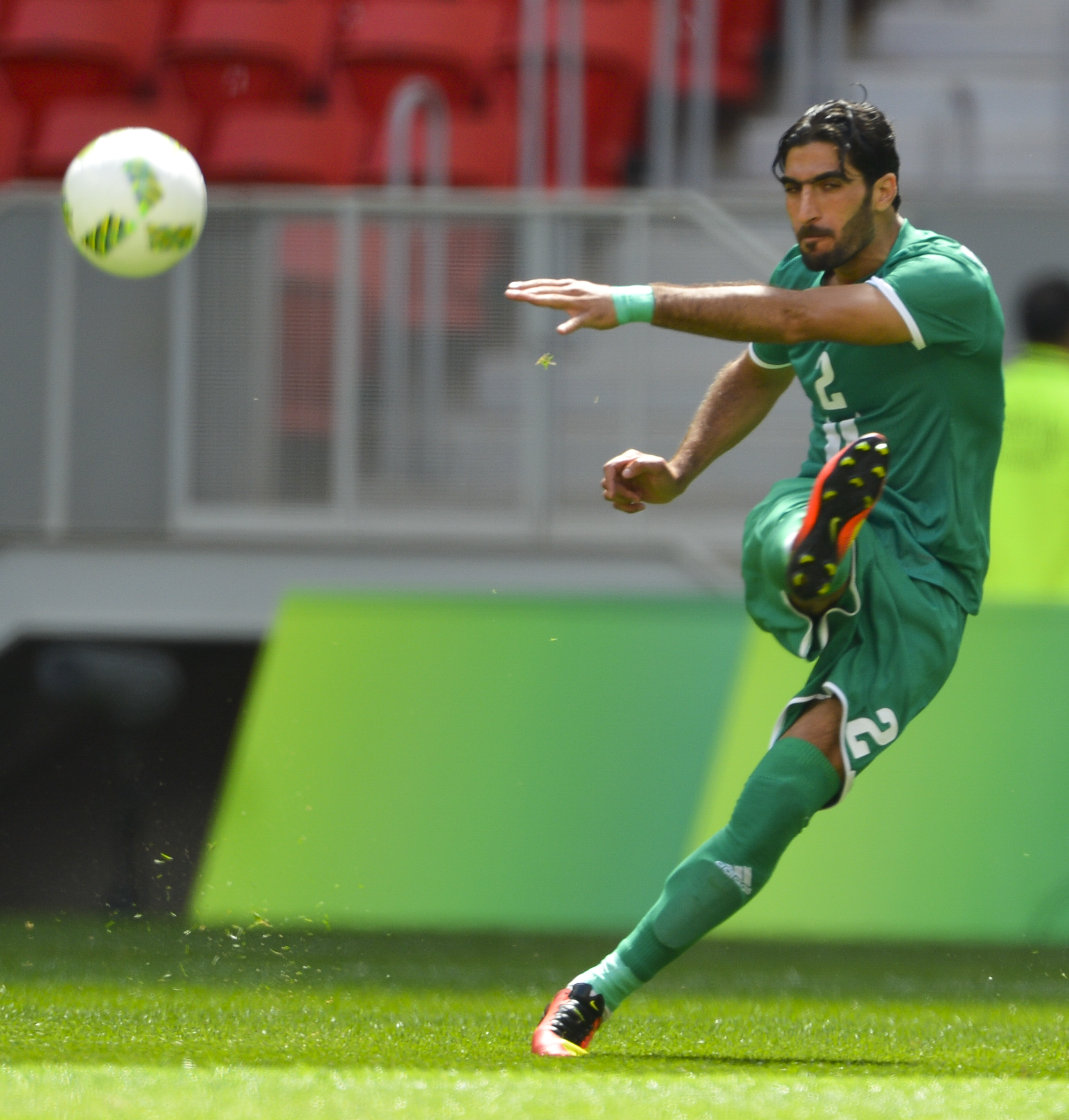
- Khalaf at the 2016 Summer Olympics

Personal information
- Full name: Ahmed Ibrahim Khalaf Al-Qafaje
- Date of birth: 25 February 1992 (age 34)
- Place of birth: Qayyarah, Nineveh Governorate, Iraq
- Height: 1.90 m (6 ft 3 in)
- Position: Centre-back

Team information
- Current team: Al-Jolan

Youth career
- –2008: Al-Qayyarah

Senior career*
| Years | Team | Apps | (Gls) |
| 2008 | Al-Shirqat | | |
| 2008–2009 | Salahaddin | | |
| 2009–2014 | Erbil | 55 | (1) |
| 2013 | → Al-Wasl (loan) | 12 | (0) |
| 2014–2015 | Ajman | 29 | (0) |
| 2015–2016 | Al-Dhafra | 13 | (0) |
| 2016 | Al-Shorta | 0 | (0) |
| 2016–2017 | Emirates | 19 | (1) |
| 2017–2018 | Al-Ettifaq | 23 | (0) |
| 2018–2019 | Al-Arabi | 19 | (1) |
| 2019–2022 | Al-Quwa Al-Jawiya | 68 | (0) |
| 2022–2023 | Erbil | | |
| 2023–2026 | Zakho | 30 | (1) |
| 2026– | Al-Jolan | | |

International career^{‡}
| 2011–2014 | Iraq U23 | 6 | (0) |
| 2016 | Iraq Olympic (O.P.) | 3 | (0) |
| 2010–2022 | Iraq | 117 | (5) |
- * Club domestic league appearances and goals as of 14 January 2018 ‡ National team caps and goals as of 10 June 2022

Ahmed Ibrahim Khalaf Al-Qafaje (Arabic: أَحْمَد إِبْرَاهِيم خَلَف الْخَفَاجِيّ; born 25 February 1992), known as Ahmed Ibrahim Khalaf, is an Iraqi professional footballer who plays for Al-Jolan and the Iraqi national team. He plays as a centre back.

== Club career ==
Ahmed Ibrahim Khalaf Al-Qafaje was born in Al-Qayyarah in Nineveh Province, some 75 km south of the city of Mosul. Ahmed starred for his local team Al-Qayyarah SC playing in defence and sometimes in midfield and was paid a handsome fee to turn out for the side. With no top division club in his home province, Ahmed moved to Al-Sharqat where he started his top flight career before he was signed by Salahddin and then Erbil, a move which opened the door for his international debut in 2010. Only two years after playing local football in Al-Qayyarah, Ahmed was lining up as a starter for the Iraqi national team against India in Sharjah and went on to be named in the 2011 Asian Cup squad.

=== Youth career ===
Ibrahim started his career at Al-Shirqat before moving to Salahddin in 2008.

=== Erbil SC ===
In 2009, at the age of 17, Ahmed, along with teammate Karrie Tariq, went to Erbil SC on a one-year contract, which was worth 60m Iraqi Dinars. Other than his short stint at Al Wasl, Ahmad remained at Erbil for five years until 2014.

=== Loan to Al Wasl ===
In January 2013, he signed a six-month loan deal with the Emirati side Al-Wasl, who he remained with until the end of the 2012–13 season. He made 12 appearances for the club and returned to Arbil in the summer of 2013.

=== Ajman ===
In the summer of 2014, Ahmed left Arbil to sign for Emirati club Ajman. He spent the season at Ajman making 29 league appearances and proving himself to be one of their key players.

=== Al Dhafra ===
After just one season at Ajman, Ahmed signed for another team in the U.A.E., Al Dhafra, on a six-month deal which expired on the first of January 2016. He made 13 appearances for the side before he left at the start of 2016. After leaving Al Dhafra, he was a free agent for the remainder of the season.

=== Al Shorta ===
Following the Olympic Games in Rio, Ahmed announced his return to the Iraqi Premier League by signing for Al Shorta but a clause in his contract stated that if an offer came in from a foreign club, he would be allowed to leave. Ahmed never ended up playing for Al Shorta as the clause was triggered.

=== Emirates Club ===
Emirates Club, another side in the U.A.E., activated that clause, and Ahmed moved back to the U.A.E. to spend the 2016–17 season with Emirates. He signed for them on 27 September 2016 and made 11 appearances, scoring one goal. The team finished in 11th place, avoiding relegation by one point. The player was free to move after the season, since his contract ran out.

=== El Ettifaq ===
On 27 June 2017, Ahmed signed a one-year contract with an option to extend. He made his debut against Al Ahli in the first round of the 2017–18 Saudi Professional League on August 11; he provided an assist in the 2–1 win.

== International career ==
=== Senior ===
Ahmed is an established international for Iraq having already played nearly 65 matches for the national team before his 25th birthday. He is on track to become one of Iraq's most capped players and is a very important figure for the national team, being the first choice centre back. On November 11, 2010, Ahmed made his debut against India. Iraq won that match 2–0. He was brought into the squad at the last minute by coach Wolfgang Sidka replacing the injured Hussein Abdul Wahid, and has remained with the side ever since. On March 28, 2015, on his 50th cap, Ahmed scored his first goal for his country heading in from a corner by Yaser Kasim in a friendly match against DR Congo in the UAE. On March 28, 2017, in a World Cup qualifier against Saudi Arabia, Ahmed produced a world class goal line clearance which kept Iraq in the game. The clearance gained a lot of attention online.

=== U23 ===
Ahmed Ibrahim was part of the squad that went to Brazil in the summer of 2016 for the Rio Olympics and was one of Iraq's standout players as his defending helped hold a Brazil team featuring Neymar, Gabriel Jesus, Marquinhos and Gabriel Barbosa to a 0–0 draw. Iraq only conceded one goal in the Olympics and, despite being knocked out after the group stages, went out undefeated.

== Career statistics ==
Scores and results list Iraq's goal tally first.

| # | Date | Venue | Opponent | Score | Result | Competition |
|---|---|---|---|---|---|---|
| 1. | 28 March 2015 | Al-Rashid Stadium, Dubai | DR Congo | 1–0 | 2–1 | Friendly |
| 2. | 5 October 2017 | Basra Sports City, Basra | Kenya | 2–0 | 2–1 | Friendly |
| 3. | 24 December 2018 | Grand Hamad Stadium, Doha | China | 1–0 | 2–1 | Friendly |
| 4. | 15 October 2019 | Olympic Stadium, Phnom Penh | Cambodia | 4–0 | 4–0 | 2022 FIFA World Cup qualification |
| 5. | 18 March 2022 | Al-Madina Stadium, Baghdad | Zambia | 2–0 | 3–1 | Friendly |

== Honors ==
Erbil SC

- Iraqi Premier League: 2011–12
- AFC Cup runner-up: 2012

Al-Quwa Al-Jawiya

- Iraqi Premier League: 2020–21
- Iraq FA Cup: 2020–21

Iraq U-23

- AFC U-22 Championship: 2013

Iraq

- Arab Nations Cup Bronze medallist: 2012
- WAFF Championship runner-up: 2012
- Arabian Gulf Cup runner-up: 2013
- AFC Asian Cup fourth-place: 2015

Individual=

- Soccer Iraq Team of the Decade: 2010–2019

== See also ==
- List of men's footballers with 100 or more international caps
