= Radio Slovenia International =

Slovenian international radio service

Coordinates: 46°32′46.19″N 15°36′51.35″E

Radio Slovenia International (RSi)
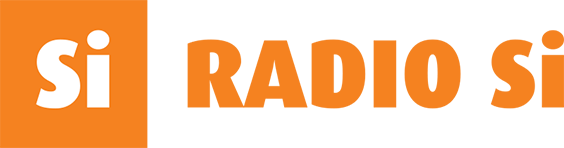
- Type: Radio network
- Country: Slovenia

Programming
- Language(s): Slovene; German; English

Ownership
- Owner: Radio-Television Slovenia

History
- Launch date: 17 June 1985 (Radio MM2); 1 July 2001 (Radio Si)
- Former names: Radio MM2 (1985–1992); Radio Maribor International (1992–1999); Slovenski Turistični Radio (1999–2001)

Coverage
- Availability: International

Links
- Website: www.rtvslo.si/radiosi

Radio Slovenia International (RSi) is the international service of Slovenian state radio on FM, Internet and via satellite.

RSi is one of the 3 foreign-language radio stations in Slovenia (the other two is the Hungarian-only Muravidéki Magyar Rádió, and Italian-only Radio Capodistria). Its broadcasts are in Slovene, German and English.

== Programming ==
RSi offers a mixture of musical and informative programmes 24 hours a day. 85% of the programme time is devoted to international and Slovene hits, and the remaining 15% is intended for political, business and economic, cultural, and sports information.

The central programme elements are weather, traffic, cultural and sports information, as well as information on events taking place in Slovenia.

== History ==
Radio Si's predecessors were the evening short news bulletins in English and German on the first programme of Radio Ljubljana (later Radio Slovenija), which could be heard far beyond the country's borders via MW 918 kHz (Domžale transmitter).

On 17 June 1985, Radio MM2 was launched from the broadcasting centre in Maribor, initially on FM 101.6 MHz (Pohorje transmitter) and MW 558 kHz, partly financed by advertising and broadcasting in German in the style of private radio stations aimed at Austria, where there was no private radio at the time. Austrian national broadcasting company ORF responded with the launch of Ö3 Steiermark (Ö3 Styria) in September 1985 as a local version of Ö3, directly adjacent to Radio MM2's frequency. It was later renamed Blue Danube Radio.

In November 1985, Radio MM2 opened the 102.8 MHz frequency, which due to the low density of stations at the time, could sometimes be heard as far away as Vienna. In 1992, cooperation with Radio CD International was established, and in December 1992, Radio MM2 was renamed Radio Maribor International (RMI). At the end of 1999 it became Slovenski Turistični Radio (STR) and on 1 July 2001 it became Radio Slovenija International (Radio Si).
