= Žurnal24 =

Slovenian online newspaper

- Type: Daily free newspaper (2007–2014); Online newspaper (since 2014)
- Owner: Styria Medien AG
- Publisher: Styria Medien AG
- Founded: 2007
- Headquarters: Ljubljana
- Circulation: 84,000 (end 2013)
- Price: free
- Website: www.zurnal24.si

Žurnal24 is a Slovenian online newspaper. Until 2014, it was a free-press widely circulated daily newspaper published in Ljubljana, Slovenia. It was the youngest daily newspaper in Slovenia, being launched by Styria Medien AG, an Austrian media group, in 2007.

Žurnal24 was distributed for free at newsstands and in public transports in the main Slovenian cities. At the end of 2013 it had a circulation of approximately 84,000 copies. Its readership reached 239,000, making of it the second most widely read Slovenian daily newspaper.

Delivered by the company Žurnal media, a subsidiary company totally owned by the Austrian Styria Media International AG. The company entered into the Slovenian media market with the weekly Žurnal in 2003, when the header Žurnal24 began publishing as its weekend edition. Žurnal24 became independent at the end of 2013, with a distributed print run of over 239,000 copies. Due to wrong business decisions and poor economic situation of the printed editions, the publisher was in a loss and therefore in 2014 the parent company decided to terminate its publication and move to an online-only publication. The last issue of Žurnal24 was published on May 15, 2014.

Multimedia Žurnal24 is still present on the web with its online portal Žurnal24.si. With 25 online journalists it has been operating since September 2007.
