= Telecommunications in Slovenia =

Telecommunications in Slovenia encompass internet, telephone, radio, and television services.

== Internet and digital progress ==
=== Users and skills ===
In 2022, Slovenia reported an internet usage rate of 88% among its population, closely aligning with the European Union (EU) average of 89%. Among individuals aged 16 to 74, 50% demonstrated at least basic digital skills, slightly below the EU average of 54%. Furthermore, 20% of the Slovenian population exhibited above-basic digital skills, below the EU average of 26%. Nonetheless, the proportion of Slovenians with at least basic digital content creation skills was 66%, matching the EU average.

=== Fixed broadband ===
Slovenia's fixed broadband infrastructure has demonstrated progress, with the Fixed Very High Capacity Network (VHCN) coverage reaching 76% of households by 2022, slightly above the EU average of 73%. Additionally, Fibre to the Premises (FTTP) coverage in Slovenia has reached 76% of households, exceeding the EU average of 56%. The adoption rate for broadband services capable of at least 100 Mbps has also seen notable growth, with 52% of households covered in 2022, up from 33% in 2020. The Slovenian government has launched a plan for the development of gigabit infrastructure by 2030, targeting gigabit connectivity for essential socio-economic drivers—such as schools, healthcare facilities, cultural institutions, transport hubs, and digital-intensive businesses—by 2025, and expanding this high-speed access to every household in Slovenia by 2030.

=== Mobile broadband ===
Slovenia's efforts in enhancing its mobile broadband infrastructure are evident through its advancements in 5G technology. The mobile broadband take-up among individuals in Slovenia was 87% in 2021, aligning with the EU average. From 0% in 2020, 5G coverage in the country has expanded to 64% in 2022, although it remains below the EU average of 81%. Slovenia has allocated 98% of the total harmonized 5G spectrum as of 2023, significantly above the EU average of 68%. Despite these advancements, a notable disparity in 5G coverage persists between urban and rural areas, with rural areas only achieving 14.1% coverage. With the plan for the development of gigabit infrastructure until 2030, Slovenia sets targets for achieving 5G coverage across all urban areas and major land transport routes by 2025, and aims to extend this coverage to all populated areas by 2030.

=== Digital public services ===
In 2022, Slovenia reported an 81% e-government user rate among internet users, above the EU average of 74%. Digital public services for citizens in Slovenia scored 71 out of 100, below the EU average of 77, while services for businesses reached 83 out of 100, closely matching the EU average of 84. Through its 'Digital Slovenia 2030' initiative, Slovenia aims to achieve the EU target score of 100 by 2030. The Digital Public Services Strategy 2021-2030, a key component of Slovenia's recovery and resilience plan, seeks to enhance the governance of digital services, focusing on user-centricity, security, and interoperability. Additionally, Slovenia's access to e-health records, scoring 80 out of 100, higher than the EU average of 72.

== Telephone ==
Telephones – number of subscribers: 200.266 analog subscribers, 517.284 VoIP subscribers (2016)

Telephones – mobile cellular: 2.341.000 users, 1.784.266 paid subscriptions and 556.223 users of prepaid phones (2016), 100.5% mobile penetration (as of 2016)

Telephone system:
general assessment: well-developed telecommunications infrastructure
domestic: combined fixed-line and mobile-cellular teledensity, roughly 150 telephones per 100 persons
international: country code – 386

== Radio and television ==
Radio broadcast stations: AM 5, FM 53 (2016)

Radios: 805,000 (1997)

Television broadcast stations: 20 (2014)

Televisions: 710,000 (1997)
