= European Journalism Centre =

European Journalism Centre (EJC)
- Abbreviation: EJC
- Formation: 1992; 34 years ago
- Headquarters: Maastricht, Limburg, Netherlands
- Director: Lars Boering
- Website: ejc.net

The European Journalism Centre (EJC) is an independent, non-profit institute, based in Maastricht, Limburg, The Netherlands.

== Operations ==
Its aim is to give further training to mid-career journalists and media professionals. The institute also acts a partner and organiser at the European level for media companies, professional organisations, journalism schools and government bodies seeking to establish activities and projects.

For an extensive research project on food worldwide, Dutch newspaper de Volkskrant was given the European Publishers' Long-term Reporting Grant. The EJC was financed for this grant by the Bill & Melinda Gates Foundation.

Its director since 2021 is Dutch photographic journalist and advisor Lars Boering.

In 2017, European Journalism Centre launched 'The News Impact' programme, an attempt to assemble hands-on professionals who may be able to tutor future journalists, on the grounds of innovation, tools of journalism as well as technology. This program, which usually consists of multiple annual events is powered by Google News Initiative.

Former director, 2006–2016, was Wilfried Ruetten, also board member of the Global Editors Network since April 2011. He was previously the head of digital television at the University of Applied Sciences in Salzburg, Austria, and has worked in German public and private broadcasting as a reporter and producer (ARD, RTL Group...) as well as in journalism education.
