= Primorske novice =

Slovenian newspaper

- Type: Daily newspaper
- Owner(s): Splošna Plovba Portorož and other companies
- Publisher: Primorske novice ČZD, d.o.o.
- Editor: Denis Sabadin
- Founded: 1963; 63 years ago
- Headquarters: Koper, Slovenia
- Circulation: 65,000 (2013)
- Website: Official website

Primorske novice (English: Littoral News) is a regional daily newspaper published in Koper, Slovenia.

== History and profile ==
Primorske novice was establied in 1963 as result of the merger of weekly paper Nova Gorica (founded in 1947) with another weekly named Slovenski Jadran (meaning "The Slovene Adriatic" in English; founded in 1950). It started as a weekly newspaper and became a daily in 2004. It became also the first regional daily newspaper in the country.

Primorske novice is published by Primorske novice d.o.o. which is based in Koper and the paper launched its website in 1996. It has no political affiliation.

As of 2009 it was still the only regional daily newspaper in Slovenia. The 2007 circulation of the paper was 23,000 copies. It became 65,000 in 2013.
