= Telekom Slovenije =

Slovenian telecommunications company

Telekom Slovenije d.d.

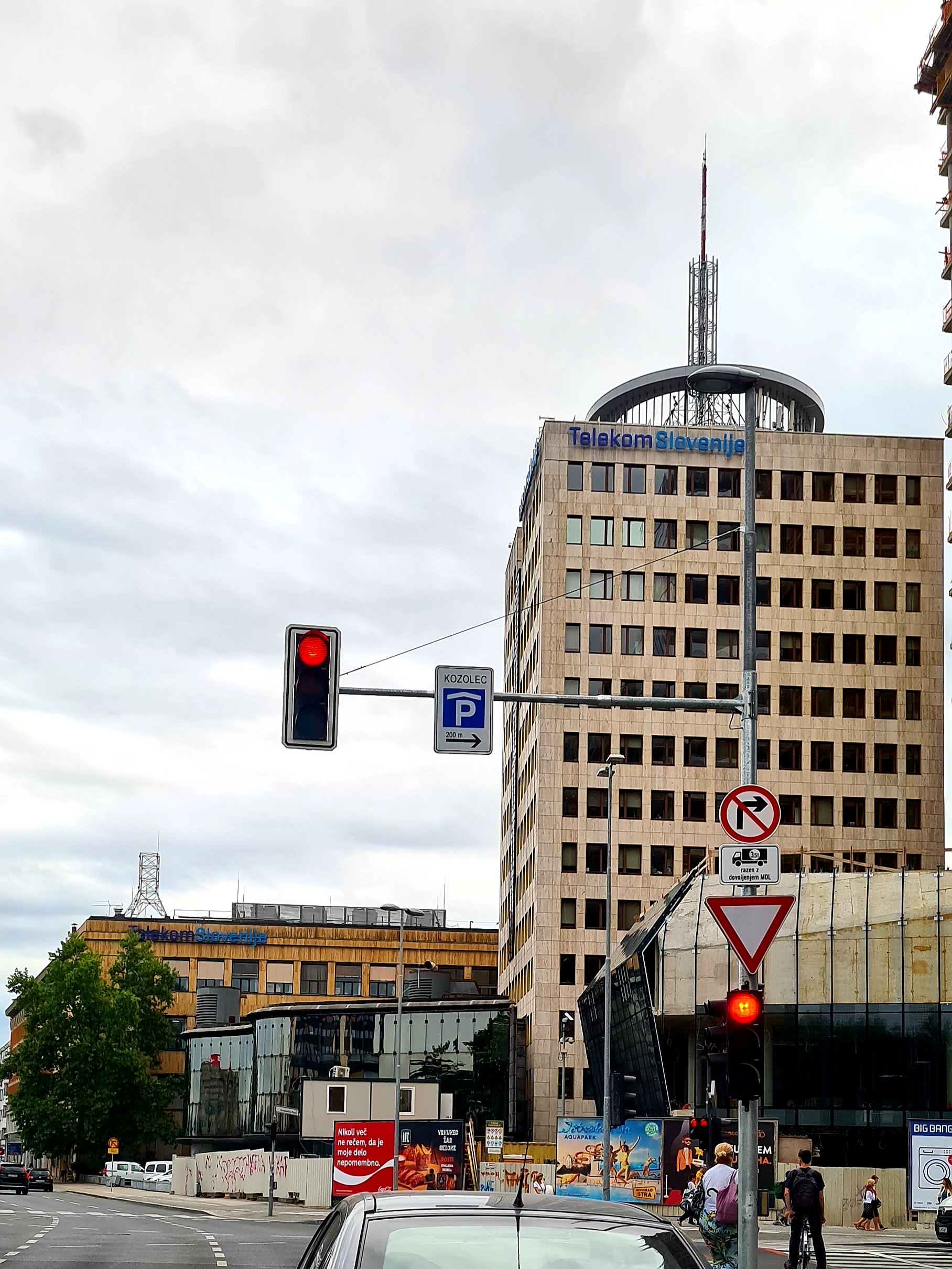
- Headquarters in Ljubljana
- Type: Public
- Traded as: LJSE: TLSG
- Industry: Telecommunications
- Founded: January 3, 1995; 31 years ago
- Headquarters: Ljubljana, Slovenia
- Key people: Cveto Sršen, President; Barbara Galičič Drakslar, Vice-President; Vesna Prodnik; Janez Zidar; Špela Fortin, Worker Director
- Products: Fixed telephony Mobile telephony Broadband Internet; IT/Network services IPTV; Electricity; Insurance
- Revenue: 681,000,000 (2018)
- Net income: 34,000,000 (2018)
- Owner: Government of Slovenia; Individual shareholders Domestic corporations Others
- Website: www.telekom.si

Telekom Slovenije d.d. (Slovene pronunciation: [ˈtéːlɛkɔm slɔˈʋèːnijɛ], "Telecom of Slovenia") is a telecommunications company based in Slovenia, with its headquarters in Ljubljana.

== History ==
In 1994 PTT Slovenija separated postal and telecommunication activities and transferred all telecommunication infrastructure to the newly founded Telekom Slovenije.

On August 31, 2013, it was announced that the Slovenian state intends to sell its 73 percent stake in Telekom Slovenije.

Slovenian Telekom owned and operated the TV channel Planet TV. In 2020 the channel was sold to the Hungarian media group TV2 Csoport owned by József Vida. Vida is close to the Hungarian ruling party Fidesz, which in turn has close political alliances with Prime Minister Janez Janša and the Serbian government led by Aleksandar Vučić. The sale to the Hungarians was also controversial because the media company United Group had submitted a better offer. United Group operates i.a. with channel N1 for Croatia, Serbia and Bosnia-Herzegovina, one of the few independent news channels in the region.

== International operations ==
Telekom Slovenije, d.d., the parent company, is part of the Telekom Slovenije Group, which also comprises subsidiaries based in Slovenia and Southeast Europe.

Subsidiaries 100% owned by Telekom Slovenije in Slovenia: GVO, d.o.o., Avtenta, d.o.o., TSmedia, d.o.o., and Soline, d.o.o.

Subsidiaries majority owned by Telekom Slovenije abroad: Ipko Telecommunications sh.p.k. (Kosovo), SIOL Prishtina L.L.C (Kosovo), Siol, d.o.o., Sarajevo (Bosnia and Hercegovina), Siol d.o.o., Beograd (Serbia), Siol d.o.o., Podgorica (Montenegro) and Siol d.o.o., Zagreb (Croatia).

== Services ==
Group activities comprise fixed and mobile communication (fixed and mobile telephony, fixed and mobile broadband services IP telephony (Voice over IP) and IPTV), digital content and services, multimedia services and digital advertising, system integration and cloud computing services, construction and maintenance of telecommunication networks, as well as conservation of natural and cultural heritage in the Sečovlje Salina Nature Park.

== Management and shares ==
The Telekom Slovenije Group is a joint-stock company with two tier management system. The management board has the executive role and represents the company, and the supervisory board exercises control over the management of company operations. The shareholders exercise their rights in the company matters through the General Meeting, which is the highest decision-making body of the company.

Telekom Slovenije shares (ticker symbol TLSG) have been listed on Ljubljana Stock Exchange (LJSE) since 2 October 2006 and were listed on the prime market of the LJSE on 3 May 2007. TLSG shares are part of the Slovenian stock exchange index SBI20 and the Slovenian Blue Chip Index SBI TOP.

== See also ==
- Telecommunications in Slovenia
