= Radio Koper =

- Type: Radio network
- Country: Slovenia
- Availability: Slovenia, Friuli-Venezia Giulia, Veneto, Istria.
- Owner: Radio-Television Slovenia
- Launch date: 1949
- Official website: Radio Capodistria

Radio Koper / Radio Capodistria is a radio station located in the city of Koper, Slovenia. It can be heard from Slovenia and northeastern part of Italy on the main frequency of FM 103.1 MHz in Italian and 88.6 MHz in Slovene, on medium wave AM 1170 kHz, 549 kHz.

Good reception is possible on DAB+ R2 Western Slovenia, frequency 227.360 MHz (channel 12C) also in Croatian Istria and Northeast Italy. It is also available on the Satellite through Eutelsat 16A a 16°Est. Radio-Television Slovenia is the owner of the Radio.

== History ==
Radio Koper was first heard on 24 May 1949, called Radio jugoslovanske cone Trsta - Radio Trieste zona Jugoslava (Radio Triest, Yugoslav Zone), and it started to broadcast a day later. It was owned by D. D. Radiofonia SA, set up by the then Yugoslav military administration Zone B of the former Free Territory of Trieste. After the abolition of the Free Territory in 1954, it teamed up with Radio Ljubljana and was later known as Radio Koper - Capodistria. Until 1954, it broadcast programs in Slovenian, Italian and Croatian. From 1954 to 1979, the program was mainly in Italian, while two short blocks were reserved to Slovenian in the morning and evening time. In 1979, the two linguistic versions of the radio separated, each with its own transmitter network. Studio Nova Gorica became operational in 1980, and in 1992 Radio Koper expanded into the Slovenian holding as an all-day radio broadcast.

Radio Koper - Capodistria as a border and minority radio station played a very important role in the history of this area in bringing together neighbouring nations, especially during the Cold War. For many years Radio Capodistria was one of the three most listened radio stations in Italy, its signal is stretched even to the shores of Africa, carrying Socialist and Titoist cross-border propaganda particularly appreciated by the members and sympathisers of the Italian Communist Party, particularly its youth. After the independence of Slovenia, Radio Koper became an organisational unit of RTV Slovenia, which has eliminated the transmission system in Italy, while the cross-border program shifted to minority and regional.

== Programming and rating ==
Radio Koper is the most listened radio station in the Slovenian Littoral and on both sides of the Slovenian-Italian border. Many listeners also come from Croatian Istria. In 2011 it was among the ten most listened radio stations in Slovenia (official data radiometry carried out by the agency Mediapool).

Radio Koper created a program that combines the informational, cultural, educational, children's, music, entertainment and sports programs. Its own program begins at 5:00 and ends at 24:00. During this time, the radio plays three regional news programs, five reports and a lot of voice and music broadcasts. During the night it broadcasts the night program of Radio Slovenija 1, which it also prepares every Friday from the studios of Koper and Nova Gorica.

In addition to regular programs, which are being prepared for all three programs, the contributions daily presence in news programming.

Radio Koper is distinguished by its rich musical productions and is also establishing itself as a promoter of cultural and social events throughout the coastal region, including that in Italy, where Slovenians live.

== Infrastructures ==
The Hendrix Studio of Radio Koper is designed for the recording and production of classical, choral and pop music. It is used for the most demanding technical music radio shows, roundtables and confrontation. It is a technologically modern music production studio, which for many years has been famous for its excellent acoustic characteristics such as the recording control box.

Radio Koper's Fonoteka keeps the archives of music and recordings from the beginning of broadcasting of the Slovenian and Italian program on different media. On the shelves is also has over 25,000 strips, 44,000 LPs, CDs 22100, 2000 CD-house production - recorded in the studio Hendrix and beyond 1100 DAT tapes. At present, the entire archive is in the process of digitisation.

Radio Koper also has a contemporary reportage truck RA 3, equipped with the most modern digital technology, which allows the sound recordings of musical events and transfers of technology-intensive events at external locations.

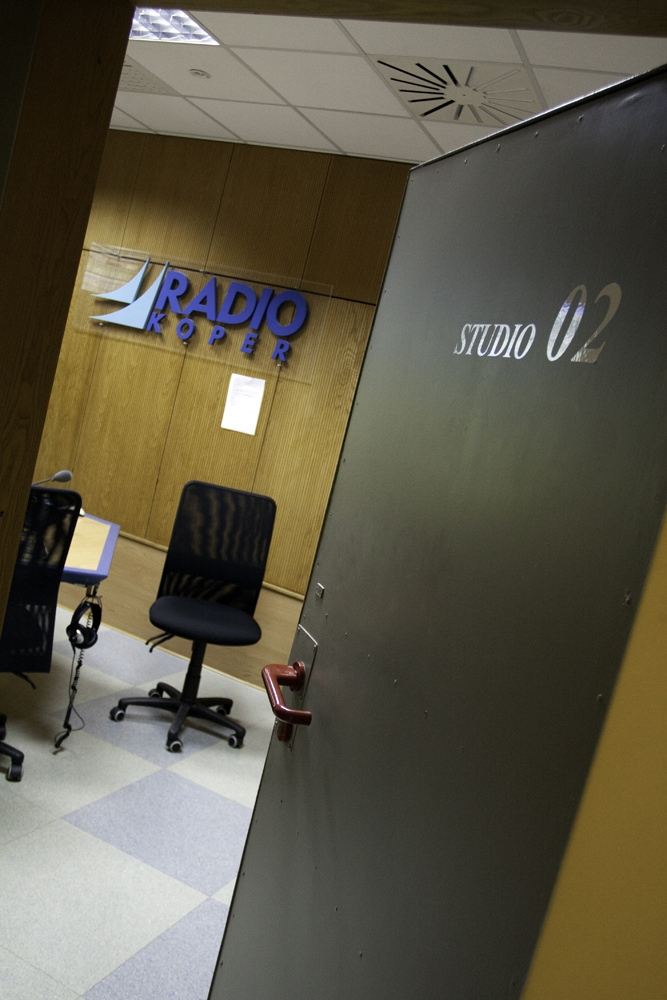
Studio 02 Radio Koper, from there live broadcasts are conducted

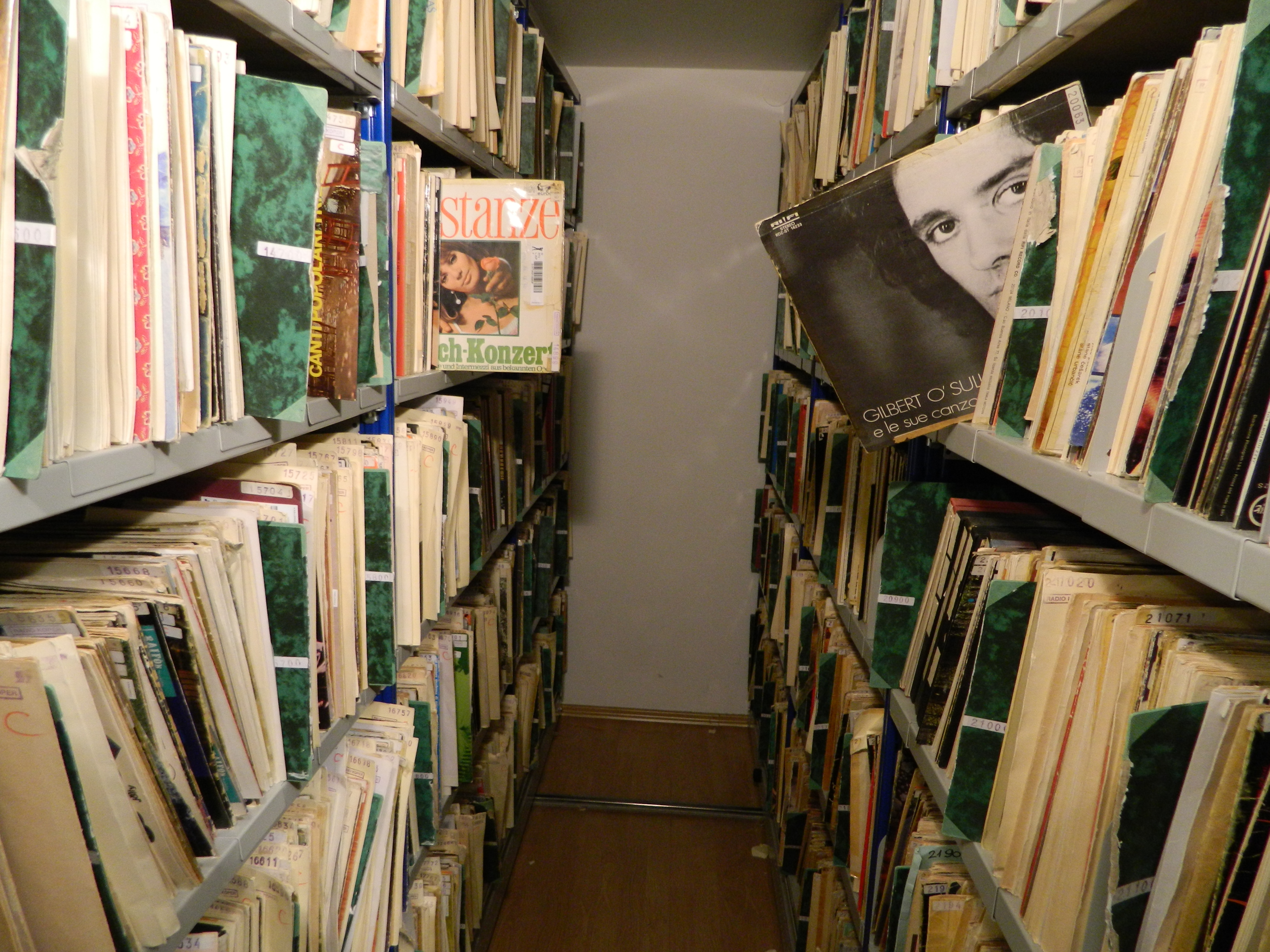
Panels in the Fonoteka Radio Koper

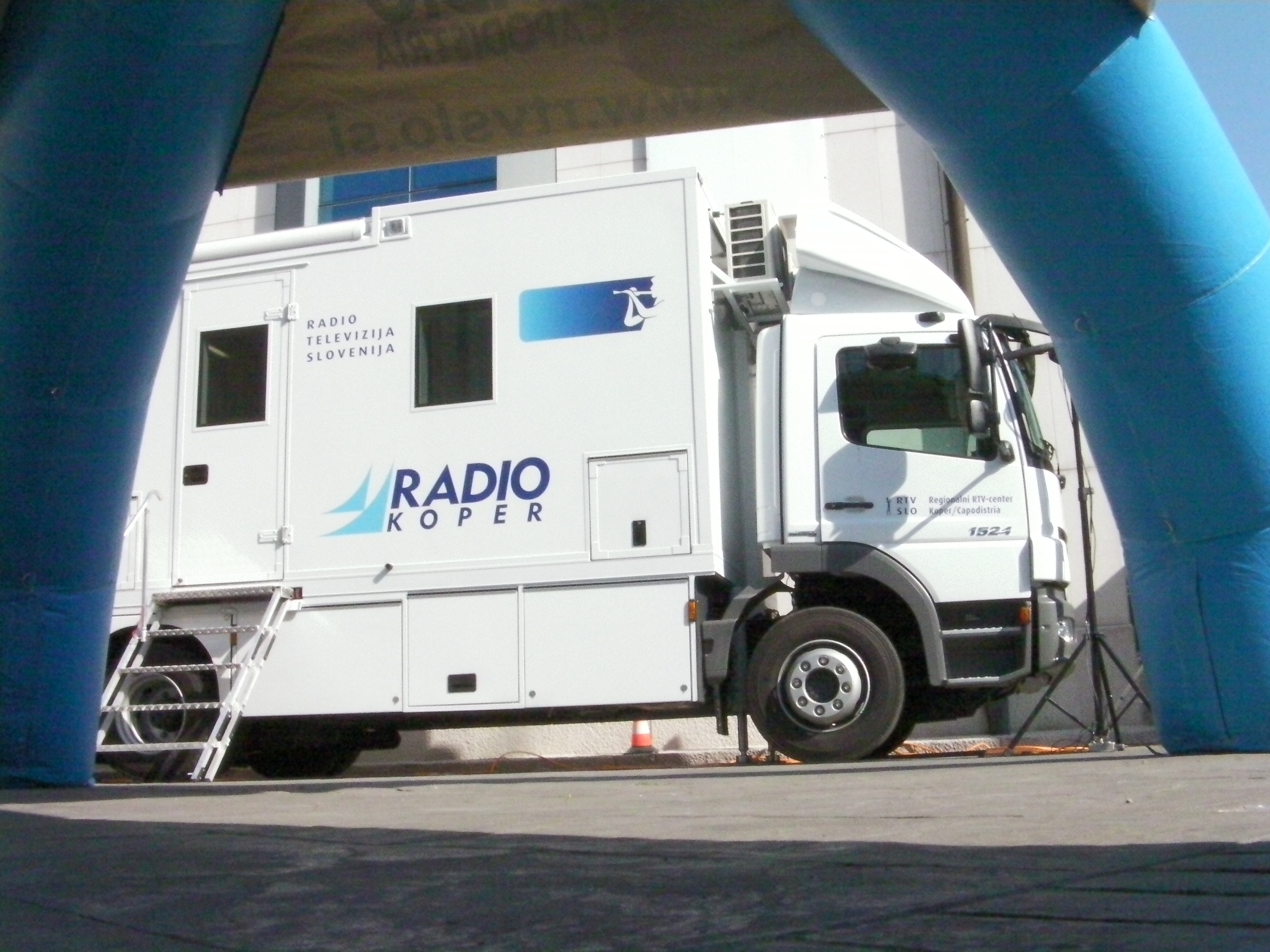
Contemporary reportage truck RA 3

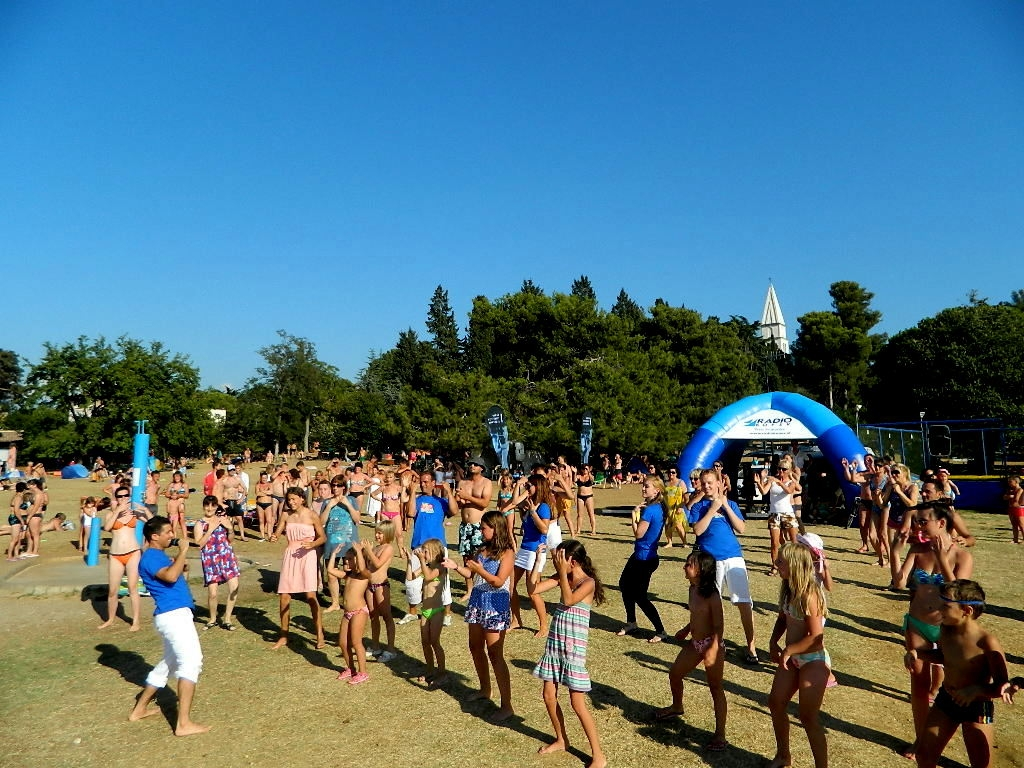
Charts Fresh blue selection at the beach Lighthouse in Izola
