= Večer (Slovenia) =

Daily newspaper published in Maribor, Slovenia

- Type: Daily newspaper
- Format: Berliner
- Publisher: Večer mediji, d.o.o.
- Editor: Matija Stepišnik
- Founded: 1945
- Political alignment: Centrism
- Headquarters: Maribor
- Circulation: 25,000 (2017)
- Website: vecer.com

Večer (English: Evening) is a daily newspaper published in Maribor, Slovenia.

== History and profile ==
Večer was officially established on 9 May 1945 as a publication declaring the liberation of Maribor called Maribor svoboden (English: Maribor Free). Regular circulation started on 25 May 1945 under the name Vestnik. But it was not before 1949 that it became a daily newspaper. In 1952, the newspaper was renamed Večer.

Slovenia's major newspaper company Delo, d.d. holds almost 80% of shares of Večer. In June 2010, the company attempted to sell its 79.24% stake to a small IT company, 3Lan, based in Murska Sobota. The sale was ordered by the competition watchdog to reduce its majority in the paper. However, the proposal of the IT company was not accepted by the ministry of culture.

The circulation of Večer was 62,000 copies in 2003. Its 2007 circulation was 53,500 copies, making it the fourth most read daily in the country. As of 2013 it was the third largest daily newspaper in Slovenia (not counting tabloids) with a circulation of about 130.000 copies daily.

There are several weekly supplements and separate editions published by Večer:

- Kvadrati (Squares) a supplement about home decoration and maintenance;
- Bonbon (Bon bon) a lifestyle supplement;
- Zmigaj se (Let's Move) about spare time activities;
- TV Večer is a weekly TV guide;
- V soboto (On Saturday) comments on politics, economy and culture by notable columnists;
- 7 dni (7 Days) a family supplement;
- Naš dom (Our Home) about design, trends and ambient;
- Vroči Kaj (Hot What) is a separate erotic magazine.
