= Finance (newspaper) =

Slovenian business and financial newspaper

Finance Business Daily
- Logo of Finance
- Type: Daily newspaper
- Format: Berliner
- Owner(s): Bonnier Group
- Publisher: Časnik Finance, d.o.o.
- Editor: Peter Frankl
- Political alignment: Liberalism
- Headquarters: Ljubljana, Slovenia
- Circulation: 16,178 (January–March 2011) to 15,152(July–September 2011)
- Website: www.finance.si

The Finance Business Daily (Slovene: Poslovni dnevnik Finance; Finance meaning Finances) is the only daily Slovenian business and financial newspaper. The idea to publish it had already been proposed by Iztok Jurančič before 1991, when Slovenia declared its independence. However, it was realized only in 1992. At first, the newspaper was published by the company Gospodarski Vestnik. Today, it is published by the Časnik Finance company, which is owned by the Swedish Bonnier Group and also publishes several other publications; for example, the magazines Manager and Moje finance, the healthcare newspaper Medicina danes, and the web portals Finance and Mojevro. As of 2008, the Finance Business Daily accounted for three quarter of the Časnik Finance company income. Before becoming a daily newspaper in 2002, Finance was issued twice weekly.

== History ==
The first issue of Finance was published on 20 May 1992. It is based in Ljubljana. The paper was initially a biweekly.

In 1993, it had over 2,000 subscribers. In 1994, Gospodarski Vestnik appointed Peter Frankl as its director. In 1999, the company Časnik Finance was established. It was owned by Gospodarski Vestnik (50%), Dagens Industrie (45%), and several individuals (5%). The director of the company was Jurij Giacomelli. The internet version of the newspaper began in October 2000.

In 2002, Finance became a daily, and the visual design changed as well. In 2005, the owner of the company Časnik Finance (99.59%) became Bonnier Business Press AB, previously called Dagens Industrie. In 2006 the owner appointed Peter Frankl as the director of Časnik Finance. He also remained the editor-at-large.

In 2003, Finance had a circulation of 10,000 copies. The 2007 circulation of the paper was 15,200 copies. According to SOZ RPN data for the last quarter of 2017, Finance had a printed circulation of 7,823 copies of which 5,842 copies were sold. In the same period, Finance had 4,141 e-subscriptions.

== Code of ethics ==
The Finance journalists have passed an ethical code, named the Code of the Journalists of the Finance Newspaper. It mainly bases on the Code of Ethics of Slovene Journalists, with the addition of several articles related to financial journalism.
