= Television in Slovenia =

Television in Slovenia was first introduced in 1958. The first TV station in Slovenia was JRT TV Ljubljana 1 (now RTV Slovenija - TV Slovenija 1) in 1958. In 1970 JRT TV Ljubljana 2 (now TV Slovenija 2) was launched and TV Slovenija 3 in 2008. Color television broadcasts began in 1976.

== Analog television ==
The following is a list of television stations in Slovenia. The channels are being broadcast in Slovenia and are sorted by regions of coverage and type of content the channels broadcast. The list does not contain internet-only television stations.

The first private TV station Kanal A was launched in May 1991, just about a month before the country's independence from Yugoslavia. The second private channel POP TV was launched by the company PRO PLUS d.o.o. in December 1995. TV3 was also launched in 1995, and was originally owned by the Roman Catholic Church. It had a poor viewership until Ivan Ćaleta, a businessman from Croatia, purchased 75% ownership of the channel in 2003, and started to offer more popular programming. Kanal A became the sister channel of POP TV in 2001, when Pro Plus took over the channel. TV3 became the new player on the market, when Swedish company MTG bought it in 2006. On 29 February 2012, it ceased broadcasting due to uncompetitive environment and unresponsiveness of Slovenian authorities.

Slovenia used the analogue PAL standard until December 1, 2010 when analog broadcasting ceased and was replaced with DVB-T.

== List of TV stations in Slovenia ==
=== Radiotelevizija Slovenija ===
- TV SLO 1
- TV SLO 2
- TV SLO 3

=== Regional ===
- Televizija Koper
- Televizija Maribor

== Commercial television channels ==
=== Pro Plus ===
- Pop
- Kanal A
- Brio
- Kino
- Oto
- Astra

=== TV2 Csoport ===
- Planet TV
- Planet 2
- Planet Eva

=== Other television channels ===
- TV3
- Nova24TV
- Gold TV
- Sport Klub
- Šport TV
- Arena Sport
- Arena eSport
- Adria TV
- Folx TV
- Net XXL
- TV Veseljak
- TV 8
- TV Nakupi
- Exodus TV
- Best TV
- TV Aktual

=== Regional television channels ===
- Gorenjska televizija
- TV Celje
- Vaš kanal
- VTV

=== Local television channels with special status ===
- ATV signal
- RTS
- TV Galeja

== Television channels with nationwide coverage ==
=== Televizija Slovenija (public broadcaster RTV Slovenija) ===
Name	Method of reception	Format	Webpage
TV SLO 1	DVB-T, DVB-C, DVB-S2, IPTV, MMDS	News, information, movies, documentaries, talkshows, children's and youth programming, game shows, religion, live coverage of important events, shows for the national minorities	
TV SLO 2	DVB-T, DVB-C, DVB-S2, IPTV, MMDS	Sports, movies, documentaries, series, drama, culture, arts	
TV SLO 3	DVB-T, DVB-C, DVB-S2, IPTV, MMDS	Information, news, parliamentary coverage, politically-oriented talkshows, press conferences	

=== Private television channels ===
Name	Method of reception	Format	Webpage
POP TV	DVB-C, IPTV, MMDS	News, reality shows, entertainment, movies, series, children's programming, telenovelas	
Kanal A	DVB-C, IPTV, MMDS	News, reality shows, movies, series, cartoons, sports	
Planet TV	DVB-C, IPTV, MMDS	News, reality shows, movies, series, cartoons, entertainment	
Planet 2	DVB-C, IPTV, MMDS	Movies, series, telenovelas	
Planet Eva	DVB-C, IPTV, MMDS	Talkshows, movies, series, telenovelas	
TV 3	DVB-C, IPTV, MMDS	Movies, series, telenovelas	
Gold TV	DVB-C, IPTV, MMDS	Series, movies, telenovelas, music, entertainment	
Brio	DVB-C, IPTV, MMDS	Series channel	
Kino	DVB-C, IPTV, MMDS	Movie channel	
Oto	DVB-C, IPTV, MMDS	Children's channel with cartoons, dubbed into Slovene	
Astra	DVB-C, IPTV, MMDS	Comedies, criminal, drama and daily Slovenian and ex-Yugoslavian series	
Sportklub	DVB-C, MMDS	Sports channels	
Šport TV	DVB-C, IPTV, MMDS	Sports channels	
Arena Sport	DVB-C, IPTV, MMDS	Sports channels	
Arena eSport	DVB-C, IPTV, MMDS	e-sports channel	
Best TV	DVB-C, IPTV, MMDS	Television channel with turbofolk music	
TV Aktual	DVB-C, IPTV, MMDS	Television channel with Croatian and Slovenian popular music	
Folx TV	DVB-C, DVB-S2, IPTV, MMDS	Television channel with Slovene traditional, folk and popular music	
Net XXL	DVB-C, IPTV, MMDS	Erotic channel	
Adria TV	DVB-C, DVB-S2, IPTV, MMDS	Television channel with traditional Dalmatian and Yugoslavian pop and rock music	
TV 8	DVB-C, IPTV, MMDS	Shopping channel	
TV Nakupi	DVB-C, IPTV, MMDS	Shopping channel	

=== Non-profit channels ===
Name	Method of reception	Format	Webpage
Top TV	DVB-C, IPTV, MMDS	24-hour news channel	
Nova24TV	DVB-C, IPTV, MMDS	24-hour news and parliamentary channel	
Exodus TV	DVB-C, IPTV, MMDS	Catholic television channel	

== Regional and local television stations ==
=== Regional channels, operated by RTV Slovenija ===
Name	Method of reception	Format	Webpage
TV Koper - Capodistria	DVB-T, DVB-C, DVB-S2, IPTV, MMDS	Regional channel for the Italian-speaking minority in the Slovene Littoral and coastal region, news, movies, sports, entertainment, documentaries	
TV Maribor	DVB-T, DVB-C, IPTV, MMDS	Regional channel for the Slovene Styria, Carinthia and the Mura region, news, movies, sports, entertainment, documentaries, programming for the Hungarian-speaking minority in the Slovene Mura region	

=== Regional television stations with special status ===
Name	Method of reception	Place of origin	Webpage
Gorenjska televizija	DVB-C, IPTV, MMDS	Kranj	
TV Celje	DVB-C, IPTV, MMDS	Celje	
Vaš kanal	DVB-T, DVB-C, IPTV, MMDS	Novo Mesto	
VTV	DVB-T, DVB-C, IPTV, MMDS	Velenje	

=== Local television stations with special status ===
Name	Method of reception	Place of origin	Webpage
ATV signal	DVB-T, DVB-C, IPTV, MMDS	Litija	
TV Idea - Kanal 10	DVB-C, IPTV, MMDS	Murska Sobota	
RTS	DVB-C, IPTV, MMDS	Maribor	
TV Galeja	DVB-C, IPTV, MMDS	Ilirska Bistrica	

=== Regional and local television stations without special status ===
Name	Method of reception	Place of origin	Webpage
ePosavje TV	DVB-C, IPTV, MMDS	Krško	
Ljubljana TV	DVB-C, IPTV, MMDS	Ljubljana	
ETV	DVB-C, IPTV, MMDS	Kisovec	
Maxi TV	DVB-C, IPTV, MMDS	Ljutomer	
vŽivo.si	DVB-C, IPTV, MMDS	Ljubljana	
KTV Ormož	DVB-C, IPTV, MMDS	Ormož	
Koroška TV	DVB-C, IPTV, MMDS	Dravograd	
Moj TV	DVB-C, IPTV, MMDS	Selnica ob Dravi	
Net TV	DVB-C, IPTV, MMDS	Maribor	
Play TV	DVB-C, IPTV, MMDS	Ljubljana	
TV Kras	DVB-C, IPTV, MMDS	Sežana	
TV Krpan	DVB-C, IPTV, MMDS	Laško	
Kanal K3	DVB-C, IPTV, MMDS	Beltinci	
Koroška regionalna televizija	DVB-C, IPTV, MMDS	Slovenj Gradec	
TV Lep	DVB-C, IPTV, MMDS	Logatec	
TVM Miklavž	DVB-C, IPTV, MMDS	Miklavž na Dravskem polju	
TV Medvode	DVB-C, IPTV, MMDS	Medvode	
Oron TV	DVB-C, IPTV, MMDS	Stari trg pri Ložu	
TV Plus	DVB-C, IPTV, MMDS	Komenda	
TV Trbovlje	DVB-C, IPTV, MMDS	Trbovlje	
Vascom TV	DVB-C, IPTV, MMDS	Pivka	
ViTel	DVB-C, IPTV, MMDS	Dornberk	
Go-TV	DVB-C, IPTV, MMDS	Nova Gorica	
Savinjska televizija	DVB-C, IPTV, MMDS	Žalec	
TV Kočevje	DVB-C, IPTV, MMDS	Kočevje	
Studio Bistrica	DVB-C, IPTV, MMDS	Slovenska Bistrica	
STV	DVB-C, IPTV, MMDS	Žalec	
ATM TV	DVB-C, IPTV, MMDS	Kranjska Gora	
Bled.TV	DVB-C, IPTV, MMDS	Bled	
AK TV	DVB-C, IPTV, MMDS	Slovenj Gradec	
TIPK TV	DVB-C, IPTV, MMDS	Television channel for the hard-of-hearing and deaf	
TV Uršlja	DVB-C, IPTV, MMDS	Ravne na Koroškem	
Tržič TV	DVB-C, IPTV, MMDS	Tržič	
Zdrava televizija	DVB-C, IPTV, MMDS	Health-oriented television channel	
Zdravje TV	DVB-C, IPTV, MMDS	Health-oriented television channel	

== DVB-T ==
Experimental DVB-T broadcasts began in 2001 using the MPEG-2 standard. In 2007 the Slovenian government decided to test DVB-T transmission in Ljubljana using the MPEG-4 standard, following the approval of the APEK (Agency for Post and Telecommunications Republic of Slovenia), now AKOS (Agency for Communication Networks and Services).

After that Radiotelevizija Slovenija had to determine which transmitter would be used for the 3-month test. They settled on the transmitters made by a Slovene company, Elti, who produces analog and digital TV transmitters. After the test, the RTV SLO decided to expand transmissions to TV SLO 2. In 2008, the RTV SLO launched a new channel: TV SLO 3 (a public affairs channel) to its digital offering. High-definition broadcast with AC-3 was experimented during the Beijing 2008 olympic games. The 2010 Winter Olympic Games were also broadcast in HD.

Currently, there is only one multiplex operating, Mux A and Mux C. Mux C ceased operating partially on 12 September 2023 and completely on 1 February 2024.

=== Mux A ===
The operator is Radiotelevizija Slovenija. Mux A is intended for public channels.

==== Channels ====
- TV SLO 1 HD
- TV SLO 2 HD
- TV SLO 3 HD
- TV Maribor
- TV Koper - Capodistria
- Vaš kanal (in Lower Carniola, Upper Carniola, Lower Sava Valley and Central Sava Valley)

=== Mux C ===
Started on October 14, 2013. The operator is Radiotelevizija Slovenija. Mux C is intended for commercial channels. In January 2022, pay-TV channels, offered by the operator Innet TV were added. On 12 September 2023 all pay-per-view channels present in Mux C ceased broadcasting. Mux C was finally switched off on 1 February 2024.

==== Channels ====
- TV Veseljak
- Nova24TV
- Star Life (pay-per-view)
- Star Crime (pay-per-view)
- Star Movies (pay-per-view)
- National Geographic (pay-per-view)
- Nat Geo Wild (pay-per-view)
- Viasat History (pay-per-view)
- Pop TV (pay-per-view)
- Kanal A (pay-per-view)
- Brio (pay-per-view)
- Kino (pay-per-view)
- Oto (pay-per-view)
- Obvestilo C

=== Local channels ===
- Mux L1: ATV Signal (Litija)
- Mux L2: TV AS (Murska Sobota)
- Mux L4: VTV Velenje

== Rating Shares (2022-2023) ==
Rank	Channel	Owner	Rating Share
1	Slovenija 1	RTV Slovenija	41.1%
2	Pop TV	Central European Media Enterprises (CME)	37.8%
3	Kanal A	Central European Media Enterprises (CME)	30.9%
4	Slovenija 2	RTV Slovenija	29.0%
5	Planet TV	TV2 Group	18.6%
6	National Geographic	National Geographic Global Networks	11.5%
7	Kino	Central European Media Enterprises (CME)	11.1%
8	Fox Crime	Fox Networks Group	10.4%
9	Discovery Channel	Warner Bros. Discovery	9.4%
10	Fox	Fox Networks Group	9.0%
