= TV SLO HD =

- Country: Slovenia
- Headquarters: Ljubljana

Programming
- Picture format: 1080i (16:9) (HDTV)

Ownership
- Owner: RTV SLO
- Sister channels: TV SLO 1; TV SLO 2; TV SLO 3; TV Koper-Capodistria; TV Maribor

History
- Launched: 8 August 2008; 17 years ago
- Closed: 1 June 2012; 13 years ago

Links
- Website: www.rtvslo.si

TV SLO HD was the first channel owned by RTV SLO to broadcast in high definition. Most of its output consisted of sporting events and was available on subscription television operators.

== History ==
The channel began broadcasting in conjunction with the beginning of the 2008 Summer Olympics.

After the first experimental broadcast, TV SLO HD started regular transmissions on 12 February 2010 to cover the 2010 Winter Olympics. Unlike the 2008 experiment, the HD channel broadcast commentary in Slovene for the first time. RTV SLO announced that it would start an HD-ready studio within a few months from then, in order to increase its output. Telemach became the first company to carry the channel.

When the Games started, Siol followed suit, providing the channel to its internet subscribers in two versions, SLO HD Full at 15Mbps and SLO HD Mini at 5Mbps.

The channel broadcast its signal over the air from the Šance transmitter in Ljubljana on UHF channel 26 on digital terrestrial television. At the time, it was the only HD channel on the platform.

On 1 June 2012, broadcasts of the channel ceased and TV SLO 1 and TV SLO 2 began broadcasting high definition feeds.
