= X Faktor (Slovenian TV series) =

- Genre: Reality competition
- Based on: The X Factor
- Developed by: Simon Cowell
- Presented by: Peter Poles, Vid Valič
- Judges: Damjan Damjanovič, Jadranka Juras, Aleš Uranjek
- Country of origin: Slovenia
- Original language: Slovenian
- No. of seasons: 1
- No. of episodes: 15

Production
- Production locations: Kino Šiška, Ljubljana; Austria Trend Hotel, Ljubljana; Kristalna palača, Ljubljana; La Subide, Italy; Mokrice Castle; Hotel Palace, Portorož; PRO PLUS studio, Ljubljana
- Production companies: FremantleMedia Australia, FremantleMedia, Syco

Original release
- Network: POP TV
- Release: 18 March – 24 June 2012

Related
- The X Factor (British TV series), The X Factor (American TV series)

X Faktor was the Slovenian adaptation of the British television show The X Factor, a reality singing competition in which contestants performed songs to impress a panel of judges and viewers for a chance at stardom. It aired for one season on the commercial channel POP TV, which also broadcast Slovenia's Got Talent.

== Judges ==
- Damjan Damjanovič – director of the Slovenian Philharmonic Orchestra
- Jadranka Juras – Slovenian jazz singer
- Aleš Uranjek – member of the rock band Šank Rock

== Winner ==
Demetra Malalan, mentored by Jadranka Juras, won the competition.

== Runner-up ==
Matija Jahn, mentored by Damjan Damjanovič, placed second in the competition.

== The competition ==
=== Producer auditions ===
Producer auditions took place from 14 to 29 January 2012 in six major cities across Slovenia: Maribor, Portorož, Kranj, Celje, Novo Mesto, and Ljubljana. Producers selected acts to participate in the next stage of the competition—the Judges’ auditions. Individuals and groups aged 14 and above were eligible to participate.

| City | Date(s) |
|---|---|
| Maribor | 14 January 2012 |
| Portorož | 15 January 2012 |
| Kranj | 21 January 2012 |
| Celje | 22 January 2012 |
| Novo Mesto | 24 January 2012 |
| Ljubljana | 28–29 January 2012 |

=== Judges’ auditions ===
The Judges’ auditions were held at the Kino Šiška complex in Ljubljana before a live audience. Judges decided whether each act would continue in the competition by giving a “yes” or “no.” This portion of the show aired in four episodes released on 18 March, 25 March, 1 April, and 8 April 2012.

=== Bootcamp ===
Bootcamp lasted for four days and took place at the Austria Trend Hotel in Ljubljana. This portion of the show aired in two episodes, released on 15 and 22 April 2012.

On the first day, 87 contestants were split into groups. Each group selected a song from an assigned list and decided which part of the song each member would sing. The groups then performed in front of the judges, and half of the candidates were eliminated.

On the second day, contestants learned a dance routine and were asked to perform it. Since everyone completed the choreography correctly, no one was eliminated. Afterward, the judges hosted a celebration at the hotel for the remaining contestants. Participants could choose to attend the party or rest in their rooms; most chose the party, knowing it might affect their performance the next day.

==== Candidates chosen by the judges to continue the competition ====
Category: teens, mentored by Damjan Damjanovič

| Contestant Name | Age | Home |
|---|---|---|
| Eva Marolt | 20 | Šmartno pri Litiji |
| Ajda Kovačič | 16 | Slovenj Gradec |
| Mitja Podlesnik | 18 | Maribor |
| Demetra Malalan | 15 | Trieste / Ljubljana |
| Žan Hauptman | 18 | Maribor |
| Alma Merklin | 20 | Murska Sobota |

Category: adults, mentored by Jadranka Juras

| Contestant Name | Age | Home |
|---|---|---|
| Andreas Videčnik | 21 | Switzerland |
| Tjaša Žalik | 24 | Prekmurje |
| Diana Filipovič | 26 | Ljubljana |
| Matija Jahn | 28 | Celje |
| Gašper Mihelič | 21 | Bela Krajina |
| Ana Soklič | 27 | Bohinj |

Category: groups, mentored by Aleš Uranjek

| Group | Members | Member Names |
|---|---|---|
| Vox Arsana | 4 | Unknown |
| 2BYONE | 3 | Unknown |
| Duo Ninja | 2 | Unknown |
| IN&OUT | 4 | Unknown |
| S.W.A.G. | 5 | Unknown |

- On the fourth day, candidates found out if they were chosen to go through to the next stage in the competition, the "Judge's Houses".

=== Judges' Houses ===
In the "Judges' Houses" portion of the show, each judge took their chosen candidates to secondary locations where the candidates would sing in front of that judge and a special guest. The judges then eliminated three of their six chosen candidates. The rest competed in the Live Shows. This portion of the show aired in two episodes released on April 29 and May 6, 2012.

Jandranka Juras took the over-21 group to Hotel Palace, Portorož in the city of Portorož, Slovenia. Jadranka's special guest was Nina Vodopivec, a former singer in the Slovenian band Tabu.

Aleš Urenjak took the multiple-member group to Mokrice Castle near the city of Jesenice, in Slovenia. Aleš's special guest was Nina Pušlar, a Slovenian pop singer.

Damjan Damjanovič took the 14–20 age group to the city of La Subide, in Italy. Damjan's special guest was his wife, Sabina Cvilak Damjanovič, a Slovenian opera singer.

==== Candidates who were chosen to compete in the Live Shows ====
| Category | Mentor | Chosen candidates |
|---|---|---|
| Teens | Damjan Damjanovič | Ajda Kovačič; Demetra Malalan; Alma Merklin |
| Over 21s | Jadranka Juras | Matija Jahn; Gašper Mihelič; Ana Soklič |
| Groups | Aleš Uranjek | 2BYONE; IN&OUT; S.W.A.G. |

=== Live show results ===
| Act | Week 1 | Week 2 | Week 3 | Week 4 | Week 5 | Week 6 | Week 7 |
|---|---|---|---|---|---|---|---|
| Demetra Malalan | Safe | Safe | Safe | Safe | Safe | Safe | Winner |
| Matija Jahn | Safe | Safe | Safe | Safe | Safe | Safe | Runner-up |
| IN&OUT | Safe | Safe | Safe | Safe | Safe | Bottom two | Third Place |
| Alma Merklin | Bottom two | Safe | Bottom two | Safe | Bottom two | Bottom two | Eliminated (week 6) |
| Ana Soklič | Safe | Safe | Safe | Bottom two | Bottom two | Eliminated (week 5) | |
| Ajda Kovačič | Safe | Safe | Safe | Bottom two | Eliminated (week 4) | | |
| S.W.A.G. | Safe | Bottom two | Bottom two | Eliminated (week 3) | | | |
| Gašper Mihelič | Safe | Bottom two | Eliminated (week 2) | | | | |
| 2BYONE | Bottom two | Eliminated (week 1) | | | | | |
| Final showdown | 2BYONE, Alma Merklin | Gašper Mihelič, S.W.A.G. | Alma Merklin, S.W.A.G. | Ajda Kovačič, Ana Soklič | Alma Merklin, Ana Soklič | Alma Merklin, IN&OUT | No final showdown or judges' vote: results are based on public votes alone |
| Juras's vote to eliminate | 2BYONE | S.W.A.G. | S.W.A.G. | Ajda Kovačič | lma Merklin | Alma Merklin | No final showdown or judges' vote: results are based on public votes alone |
| Uranjek's vote to eliminate | Alma Merklin | Gašper Mihelič | Alma Merklin | Ajda Kovačič | Ana Soklič | Alma Merklin | No final showdown or judges' vote: results are based on public votes alone |
| Damjanovič's vote to eliminate | 2BYONE | Gašper Mihelič | S.W.A.G. | Ana Soklič | Ana Soklič | IN&OUT | No final showdown or judges' vote: results are based on public votes alone |
| Eliminated | 2BYONE; 2 of 3 votes Majority | Gašper Mihelič; 2 of 3 votes Majority | S.W.A.G. 2 of 3 votes Majority | Ajda Kovačič; 2 of 3 votes Majority | Ana Soklič; 2 of 3 votes Majority | Alma Merklin; 2 of 3 votes Majority | IN&OUT; Third Place |
| Eliminated | 2BYONE; 2 of 3 votes Majority | Gašper Mihelič; 2 of 3 votes Majority | S.W.A.G. 2 of 3 votes Majority | Ajda Kovačič; 2 of 3 votes Majority | Ana Soklič; 2 of 3 votes Majority | Alma Merklin; 2 of 3 votes Majority | Matija Jahn; Runner-up |
