= Dirty Sexy Money =

American television series

- Genre: Dramedy; Satire; Soap opera
- Created by: Craig Wright
- Starring: Peter Krause; Donald Sutherland; Jill Clayburgh; William Baldwin; Natalie Zea; Glenn Fitzgerald; Seth Gabel; Samaire Armstrong; Zoe McLellan; Lucy Liu; Blair Underwood; Candis Cayne; Will Shadley
- Composer: Peter Nashel
- Country of origin: United States
- Original language: English
- No. of seasons: 2
- No. of episodes: 23

Production
- Executive producers: Craig Wright; Greg Berlanti; Peter Horton; Matthew Gross; Bryan Singer; Josh Reims; Jon Harmon Feldman
- Producer: Melissa Berman
- Production location: Los Angeles/New York City (pilot)
- Editor: Geofrey Hildrew
- Running time: 60 minutes
- Production companies: Berlanti Television; ABC Studios

Original release
- Network: ABC
- Release: September 26, 2007 – August 8, 2009

The Season 1 cast of Dirty Sexy Money.

Dirty Sexy Money is an American prime time drama television series created by Craig Wright that ran for two seasons on ABC from September 26, 2007, to August 8, 2009. The series was produced by Berlanti Television and ABC Studios. Wright served as an executive producer alongside Greg Berlanti, Bryan Singer, Matthew Gross, Peter Horton, and Josh Reims, with Melissa Berman producing.

The series revolves around lawyer and family man Nick George, portrayed by Peter Krause. When Nick's father mysteriously dies in a plane crash, he agrees to take his position as the Darling family's lawyer, while trying to discover who committed the murder. The Darlings, the richest family in New York, constantly rely on Nick to solve their problems. Nick struggles to balance his morals and family life while dealing with the demands of the Darlings.

== Premise ==
The Darlings are a prominent and wealthy family in New York with high ambitions who frequently encounter complex legal conflicts. Nick George serves as their lawyer to address these situations and manage public relations and potential legal issues. Nick initially declined to work for the family, following his father, who previously served as their long-term adviser. Nick remains uncertain about his ongoing professional relationship with the family.

Due to the cancellation of the show, the running plot line of the mystery of Dutch George will never be solved. Craig Wright told the Los Angeles Times that had the series lasted, Juliet would have been arrested after getting into a situation like that of Patty Hearst, later teaching drama at a boarding school in Connecticut, marrying the school's soccer coach and having kids.

== Cast and characters ==
=== Main ===
- Peter Krause as Nick George
- Donald Sutherland as Patrick "Tripp" Darling III
- Jill Clayburgh as Letitia Darling
- William Baldwin as Patrick Darling IV
- Natalie Zea as Karen Darling
- Glenn Fitzgerald as Brian Darling Sr.
- Seth Gabel as Jeremy Darling
- Samaire Armstrong as Juliet Darling (season 1)
- Zoe McLellan as Lisa George
- Blair Underwood as Simon Elder
- Lucy Liu as Nola Lyons (season 2)

== Broadcast history ==
The series premiered in the United States on September 26, 2007, on ABC following the Grey's Anatomy spin-off, Private Practice, airing on Wednesday nights at 10:01 P.M. Eastern/9:01 P.M. Central. On November 16, 2007, ABC ordered a full 22-episode season for the show, making it the first show to receive a full season order since the WGA writers' strike began on November 5, 2007. However, in the end, the first season comprised only 10 episodes due to the strike. Dirty Sexy Money: The Complete First Season, a three-disc DVD set including all 10 original episodes and exclusive bonus features including bloopers, audio commentary, deleted scenes, and featurettes, and more, was released on September 16, 2008. The second season premiered on October 1, 2008, ten months after the first-season finale.

On November 20, 2008, ABC decided not to order any additional episodes for the 2008–2009 TV season. On December 10, 2008, Billy Baldwin appeared on NBC's Today Show asking for fans to support the show by watching the show and by visiting the ABC website and sending nice messages of support to the ABC executives. He said the show was not canceled, but on hiatus until ABC knew how the midseason replacement shows fared. All cast and sets continued to be contracted and on hold. The last scheduled episode of Dirty Sexy Money aired on December 17, 2008, while four episodes remained unaired in the USA though they were broadcast elsewhere.

After Dirty Sexy Money was officially canceled, ABC announced the series would return on Saturday, July 18, 2009, at 10:00 P.M. Eastern/9:00 P.M. Central. The final episode, "The Bad Guy", aired on August 8, 2009, and the second season came out on DVD on August 18, 2009.

=== International distribution ===
In Canada, CTV first aired the show on Sundays at 10 P.M. (four days after ABC), then it moved to 7 P.M. CTV then moved the show to its secondary A system effective October 24, 2007 where it airs it in simulcast Wednesdays at 10 P.M.

The show will be broadcast on TNT in Spain, Studio 23 in Philippines, Dizimax in Turkey and Nelonen in Finland. The series is being broadcast in Spain on TNT and Antena 3 since January 17, 2008.

New Zealand's TV2 started airing the show Wednesday nights at 9:30 P.M., beginning February 6, 2008.

In Australia, the Seven Network began airing Season one on Monday February 11, 2008 at 9:30 P.M. Season Two began on December 2, 2008, initially at 9:30 P.M., but due to low ratings, it was pushed back to 11:30 P.M. The Seven Network in Australia has aired all episodes of Season 2 that were unaired in the USA. Also Kanal 5 in Sweden aired the episodes, the last one on March 18, 2009.

In Latin America, the series began broadcasting on February 12, 2008, on the AXN channel, season 2 will begin broadcast on February 3, 2009.

The series premiered in the United Kingdom on March 21, 2008, at 9 P.M. on Channel 4. Dirty Sexy Money was on hiatus due to the WGA writers' strike as of January 9, 2008, the date on which replacement series Cashmere Mafia assumed the time slot. Men in Trees, which has a total of 11 filmed unaired episodes available, assumed the slot on February 27, 2008, potentially for the balance of the spring season.

In the United Kingdom, Channel 4 began airing the episodes on Friday, March 21, 2008, at 9:00 P.M. Channel 4 began airing the second season on March 8, 2009, on E4 in the 11 o'clock timeslot. Because of its cancellation in the US and low ratings for its first season in the UK there will be no new shows on Channel 4 for the foreseeable future. However, Season 2 commenced airing on E4 in a new time slot. For Season One it aired Tuesday nights at 9:00 P.M., whereas for Season Two it aired on Sunday nights at 11 P.M. between March 8 and May 31, 2009, including the four episodes not yet shown in the US.

In Israel, the series was launched under the name "Money, Darling" on July 7, 2008, on Yes Stars Drama. Season 2 premiered on February 16, 2009, with all 13 episodes confirmed to air consecutively, including those not aired in the US.

In Hong Kong, the series was premiered Thursday nights at 10:30 P.M. on July 17, 2008, on the mainly English free-to-air network TVB Pearl with bilingual audio in both English and Cantonese and widescreen on the same channel in Digital. Series 2 is due to air on March 26, 2009, at the same time-slot. Same as the rest of the world, Hong Kong also aired the unaired episodes before the US on May 28, 2009, starting with the thanksgiving recap episode "The Facts".

In Russia, the show premiered on 1TV in summer 2008. Two seasons were shown in summer of 2009. The series launched under the name "Dirty Wet Money". In 2012 the show was aired late at nights on Domashny channel.

In North Macedonia, the show aired Sundays at 12:00 P.M. in 2008 on A1 television, and later on Fox Life.

In Ireland RTÉ One began airing the program on Friday, August 1, 2008, at 00:05.

In South Africa, the series began in September 18, 2008 and the full series has been aired on the local satellite or analog channel M-Net. The channel has broadcast the remaining episodes of Season 2 which followed on from the Organ Donor episode which aired on January 29, 2009. The series aired on Thursday nights at 8:30 p.m. with a repeat on Sundays at 2:00 p.m. The season finale has aired on February 5, 2009.

In France, the show premiered on Canal+ pay TV in 2008 and the second season was aired from 2009 until Feb 11, 2010.

In Norway, the show premiered on TVNorge on November 12, 2008.

The first season premiered in Greece on Fox Life on December 3, 2008. All 10 episodes aired. Season 2 premiered in October 2009. The show also will premiered on ANT1 on 2010.

In Estonia, the show premiered on TV3 in summer 2009.

The show is broadcast on Fox Life in Bulgaria.

In Slovenia, the show's 1st season aired on Mondays on POP TV, It reaired on POP TV's new sister channel POP BRIO in September 2010, after the reruns the 2nd season premiered in the same time slot (Monday–Friday at 10 P.M.).

== Marketing ==
=== Promotion ===
Using publicity from Paris Hilton's jail sentence controversy, ABC placed full-page advertisements in the Los Angeles Times and The New York Post that read: "We love Paris. The Darling Family." Later, an airplane towing a banner with the same message flew above the downtown courthouse on June 8 during Hilton's subsequent hearing. The network has also placed fake advertisements on popular gossip blog Perezhilton.com on August 6, 2007 "denouncing" the diva-like behavior of Samaire Armstrong's character, Juliet Darling, among others.

The song "Beautiful, Dirty, Rich" by singer Lady Gaga was used during advertisements for the show. Clips from the show were also used in an alternate version of the music video

== Episodes ==
Season	Episodes	Originally released	
Season	Episodes	First released	Last released
1	10	September 26, 2007	December 5, 2007
2	13	October 1, 2008	August 8, 2009

=== Season 1 (2007) ===
No. overall	No. in season	Title	Directed by	Written by	Original release date	US viewers (millions)
1	1	"Pilot"	Peter Horton	Craig Wright	September 26, 2007	10.44
Nick George is a successful attorney who has been pulled back into a life he had left behind when his father dies in a mysterious plane crash. He is hired as his father's replacement by the Darlings, a rich family in New York City whose lives are filled with scandal.
2	2	"The Lions"	Michael Grossman	Craig Wright	October 3, 2007	9.61
Nick organizes the entire Darling family together for a photo shoot complete with Lions, but without Juliet, who refuses to take part. Patrick deals with pressure from his father to announce his run for the senate, while Brian and Jeremy deal with complications in their relationships.
3	3	"The Italian Banker"	Michael Grossman	Josh Reims & Tad Quill	October 10, 2007	8.63
Nick runs damage control after the family is blackmailed with a sex tape. Patrick is forced to end his relationship with Carmelita, while Brian's wife learns that her new house guest can speak English. Jeremy's relationship with Natalie becomes hazardous when both she and Juliet show up to Patrick's campaign fundraiser.
4	4	"The Chiavennasca"	Michael Lange	Diane Ruggiero & Chris Landon	October 17, 2007	8.67
Nick goes to Italy to meet the detective who presumably compiled the Simon Elder dossier, and brings back a bottle of Chiavennasca. With him goes his wife Lisa, as well as two uninvited guests: Karen and Freddy. Juliet finds Jeremy in bed with Natalie in his room, then Jeremy stands up for woman he loves. Reverend Brian has new insights of his son.
5	5	"The Bridge"	James Frawley	Peter Elkoff & Jessica Brickman	October 24, 2007	8.56
Nick makes a connection with Simon Elder, while Jeremy and Juliet feud over Jeremy's relationship with Natalie. They both refuse to throw a joint birthday party, and instead decide to throw to separate million dollar parties. Brian's wife learns of her husband's infidelity, and Karen fights to get her fiance into the country club.
6	6	"The Game"	David Petrarca	Craig Wright & Yahlin Chang	October 31, 2007	8.38
Simon tells Nick he will help him find the man who killed his father if Tripp puts up something he wants very badly. Karen needs a favor from her irresistible ex husband, and Jeremy buys his way out of trouble in the first day of his real job working as a parking valet at his parents' "Darling Parking Lot".
7	7	"The Wedding"	Jamie Babbit	Peter Elkoff & Jake Coburn	November 14, 2007	7.90
Karen has second thoughts about marrying Freddy, both Lisa & Letitia believe that Nick is the reason. Brian Jr.'s mother returns, and Ellen Darling discovers her husband's affair. Meanwhile, Natalie tries to make amends with Juliet, but Jeremy believes she has an ulterior motive.
8	8	"The Country House"	Michael Schultz	Nancy Won & Josh Reims	November 21, 2007	6.52
Thanksgiving has arrived and Nick George wants to spend the day with his wife and daughter, but Tripp has another idea. Tripp wants Nick to set up a meeting with Simon Elder so Tripp and Simon can talk face-to-face once and for all. Meanwhile, Letitia helps Karen try and to get closer to Nick. Brian fights to keep his ex-girlfriend, Andrea, from taking his son away from him while Jeremy goes on a first date with Sofia.
9	9	"The Watch"	Andrew Bernstein	Liz Tigelaar & Yahlin Chang	November 28, 2007	7.15
This flashback episode reveals secrets about Dutch and the relationships he had with Nick, Tripp, and Letitia. Karen's intimate view towards Nick is put on hold as she takes a liking to Simon Elder. Brian's attempt to get his son takes a turn he didn't expect and Jeremy continues to hide how much he is worth from Sofia.
10	10	"The Nutcracker"	Tony Goldwyn	Joey Soloway & Craig Wright	December 5, 2007	6.91
Nick learns of Simon and Karen's affair, Brian is thrust into an existential career crisis, Lisa guides Jeremy in his quest to impress Sofia, Juliet has a visitor from the Seychelles, and Carmelita tells Patrick she's being watched.

=== Season 2 (2008–09) ===
No. overall	No. in season	Title	Directed by	Written by	Original release date	US viewers (millions)
11	1	"The Birthday Present"	Jeff Melman	Craig Wright & Jon Harmon Feldman	October 1, 2008	7.02
Six months have passed since the events of last season. Even as Lisa and Nick plan to celebrate his birthday privately and quietly, Tripp and Letitia Darling decide to throw a lavish party for Nick on their yacht. Nick helps in reconciling Tripp and Patrick, who is still burdened with his troubled marriage and missing transgender lover. Brian is reunited with his illegitimate son, while Karen and Simon Elder escalate their relationship. Jeremy reveals his feelings for Lisa to Nola Lyons. Amidst the Darling drama, a death occurs within the family, and someone is arrested for murder.
12	2	"The Family Lawyer"	Andrew Bernstein	Craig Wright	October 8, 2008	5.85
The newscasts report and speculate on the fiery demise of the Darlings' Valhalla estate, as well as a Darling's death in the fire. At the same time, the family must also deal with funeral arrangements and the aftermath of the arrest of an unforeseen suspect in the murder of Dutch George. Brian recommends to Tripp that, in order to restore confidence in Darling Enterprises, a successor be named a role Simon feels that Karen deserves. Meanwhile, a smitten Jeremy learns Nola Lyons' true profession, Nick and Lisa discuss having another child, and recording artist Kenny G performs.
13	3	"The Star Witness"	Robert Berlinger	Yahlin Chang	October 22, 2008	5.75
Now that Nick has agreed to defend Letitia in the murder case of Dutch George Nick's father and Letitia's secret lover he is disturbed to learn that his estranged mother is on prosecutor Nola Lyons' witness list. Meanwhile, because they have to keep their affair a secret, Jeremy surprises Nola with a private concert by the Weepies; Patrick plans to clear his conscience about his wife's death, but Tripp dissuades him in a shocking way during a senatorial debate moderated by Dan Rather; Brian goes to Brazil to kidnap Brian Jr.; and Simon and Karen continue their loving ways, still unclear if one is plotting against the other.
14	4	"The Silence"	Robert Berlinger	Jake Coburn	October 29, 2008	6.06
As Election Day nears, senatorial candidate Patrick insists to a disapproving Tripp that he wants to take his relationship public with his transgender mistress, Carmelita. Meanwhile, Ellen's brother, Chase, shows up and demands from Patrick the truth about his sister's death. In other developments, Nick and Lisa are in couples therapy; Jeremy asks Nola to ease Letitia's house arrest so she can go to Patrick's election night party; Brian Jr. goes missing, and, at Karen's request, Nick talks to Simon about his real motive for wanting to marry her.
15	5	"The Verdict"	Andrew Bernstein	Craig Wright & Jon Harmon Feldman	November 5, 2008	6.15
While constantly being challenged in court by prosecutor Nola Lyons, Nick is facing an uphill battle defending Letitia in the murder case. But the situation changes quickly after Nick discovers a dirty little secret about Nola. Later on he learns by chance some surprising news about Lisa from Joel Madden, one of the attendees at her art gallery opening. Meanwhile, Karen asks Nick to tell Tripp that she's marrying family nemesis Simon Elder, Tripp attempts to wield his influence over Patrick in choosing his chief of staff, and Brian and Andrea learn some shocking news after a visit to the doctor.
16	6	"The Injured Party"	Dean White	Paul Redford & Sallie Patrick	November 19, 2008	5.58
Letitia hits a young, pretty bicyclist with her car. To avoid another public scandal, Tripp invites Wrenn, to recuperate at the Darling mansion, where she charms a few but makes others suspicious. The claws come out during a catty showdown between Lisa and Karen over Nick. Meanwhile, fired prosecutor Nola Lyons delights Patrick with her aggressive ways as his new Chief of Staff, but Tripp and the spurned Jeremy are less than pleased by her presence; and, much to Brian's surprise, Andrea refuses to fight her cancer by entering a medical trial.
17	7	"The Summer House"	Jamie Babbit	Bill Chais & Jake Coburn	December 3, 2008	5.64
As Karen excitedly prepares for her wedding day, she is convinced that this fifth marriage to family nemesis Simon Elder -- is the one that will end in happily ever after. But Tripp is still suspicious of Simon's real motives and wants Nick to make one last-ditch effort to keep the wedding from happening. Lisa hopes taking Jeremy to the wedding will make Nick jealous. In other developments, Patrick hires Jeremy to join his senate team, against Nola's protestations; Brian finds himself drawing closer to Andrea as her illness worsens; and when Letitia sees Tripp paying too much attention to their houseguest, Wrenn, she realizes that this pretty, young woman has overstayed her welcome.
18	8	"The Plan"	Michael Schultz	Yahlin Chang & Emily Whitesell	December 10, 2008	5.24
Filled with love for Carmelita, newly-elected Senator Patrick Darling goes against Nick and Tripp's advice and invites her to his inauguration. Meanwhile, Chase defies his agreement with the Darlings and threatens to go public with his accusation that Patrick murdered his sister; Jeremy finds out that Simon has control of Nola's little brother; as Andrea's health dims, Brian promises God anything to make her well again; and Karen goes to Nick's apartment to make amends with him, but is confronted by a gun-wielding Chase.
19	9	"The Organ Donor"	Michael Grossman	Sallie Patrick	December 17, 2008	5.13
The Darlings deal with the aftermath of the shooting spree at Patrick's inauguration by Ellen's brother, Chase. In the confusion that followed, Jeremy got amnesia, Chase was shot and Patrick's mistress was killed. Simon, Nick and the Darlings all have their reasons for not seeing Chase come out of his coma, but Chase's wife, Janine, isn't ready to pull the plug. Meanwhile, the newly-divorced Nick and Lisa discuss custody arrangements for Kiki, and Brian finds himself back in the pulpit while dealing with his relationship with Andrea.
20	10	"The Facts"	Matthew Gross, Jeff Melman, Tom Verica, Robert Berlinger, Michael Grossman and Tim Matheson	Christopher Landon, Lakesha Walker, Peter Elkoff, Jake Coburn, Sallie Patrick, Daniel Cerone and Bill Chais	July 18, 2009	2.15
A gossip columnist interviews chauffeur Clark on Thanksgiving about several scandals surrounding the Darling family. (This episode was intended to air November 26, 2008 but was pre-empted by Barbara Walters' interview of Barack Obama.)
21	11	"The Convertible"	Peter O'Fallon	Jon Harmon Feldman & Emily Whitesell	July 25, 2009	1.83
Brian, Karen and Nick are all going to DC. Nick is trying to get Kiki back from Lisa after she took her for the weekend, Brian claims to be going to a dinner Patrick is hosting, and Karen decides to want a child and decides to visit a sperm bank. When the plane threatens to crash, Karen and Nick finally own up to their feelings for one another. Meanwhile, Tripp asks Patrick to deal with a congressman who voted against Simon Elder's bio-fuel and discovers something personal about the congressman. Karen finds out she is already pregnant but is reluctant to tell Nick.
22	12	"The Unexpected Arrival"	Michael Watkins	Paul Redford	August 1, 2009	2.28
Simon provides Nola with a solution to her problems. Nick finds out that Karen is pregnant with Simon Elder's baby. Andrea kicks Brian out of their house because she finds out that he had traveled to DC hoping for a tryst with his ex-wife. The Bio-fuel partnership between Tripp and Simon is finalized.
23	13	"The Bad Guy"	Robert Berlinger	Craig Wright	August 8, 2009	2.19
After an attack, Simon recovers in the Imperial and finally tells Nick his motivations for dealing with the Darlings, leading to a surprise confession about Nick's father. Meanwhile, Lisa publicizes a tell-all book about the Darlings which may damage the family name. Karen suffers a miscarriage but embarks on a long-overdue relationship with Nick, who she has always loved. They discuss starting a family together, and it seems they have a real future. In the last minutes of the episode, Simon reveals to Nick that his father Dutch is still alive and that he is responsible of all the Darling's misfortunes, because he wants to take his revenge on Letitia.

== Home media ==
Walt Disney Studios Home Entertainment released both seasons on DVD in Regions 1, 2 and 4 in 2008/2009. The region 1 releases have been discontinued and are now out of print.

On February 9, 2012, it was announced that Lionsgate Home Entertainment had acquired the rights to the series and plan on re-releasing it. Seasons 1 and 2 was re-released on May 1, 2012.

DVD Name	Ep#	Release dates		
DVD Name	Ep#	Region 1	Region 2	Region 4
The Complete First Season	10	September 16, 2008	October 27, 2008	October 29, 2008
The Complete Second and Final Season	13	August 18, 2009	October 19, 2009	November 4, 2009
