= Pop (Slovenian TV channel) =

Slovenian television channel

- Country: Slovenia

Ownership
- Owner: Pro Plus d.o.o. (CME)
- Sister channels: Kanal A, KINO, BRIO, OTO

History
- Launched: 7 July 1995 (test broadcast); 15 December 1995 (formal launch)

Links
- Website: www.24ur.com

Pop TV is a Slovenian generalist television channel operated by Pro Plus d.o.o., a subsidiary of Central European Media Enterprises (CME), which is in turn owned by PPF.

== Children's Programming ==
- Paw Patrol
- Rubble & Crew
- Pupstruction
- Bluey (TV series)
- SuperKitties

The Ren and Stimpy Show

== History ==
It was established by ProPlus, CME's Slovenian subsidiary, in 1995. The channel was the first media outlet to be financed with foreign money, by means of a US loan. The output consisted largely of imported programs while the news was limited to the main evening bulletin. As of 2001, 79% of its programming was foreign.

== News programs ==
POP TV's current news programming consists of the main 24UR ("24Hours") News and 24UR zvečer . Within 24UR, the following segments are currently airing: "POP IN", "Vizita" ("Medical visit"), "24UR Inšpektor" ("24Hours Inspector") and "24UR Fokus" ("24Hours Focus").

=== 24UR ===
The current hosts of the show are two hosting pairs: Darja Zgonc & Edi Pucer, and Jani Muhič & Petra Krčmar. Weekdays the show is hosted by one pair and the pairs exchange each week. Weekend shows are hosted by individual hosts from each pair.

The show is criticized as having a left-wing bias. It is often accused by the Slovenian right-wing party SDS to not report about the Slovenian "underground" political corruption that SDS believes to come from many former members of the Slovenian Communist Party that ruled during the era of socialism in Slovenia and according to this conspiracy theory still has a huge influence on Slovenian state-owned companies and left-wing political parties.

==== 24UR's milestones ====
POP TV has been airing its main news program, 24UR, since it commenced its official broadcasts on 15 December 1995. In the beginning, the show aired from 7:30 pm to 8 pm, and was hosted by Drago Balažič (sports news by Franci Petek, weather forecast by Miran Trontelj).

From April 1996, Darja Zgonc and Boštjan Lajovic took over the hosting of the show as the first hosting couple. The pair hosted the show between Monday and Thursday. From Friday to Sunday, the show was hosted by Tamara Vonta and Drago Balažič, individually.

In 1997, the show introduced a second hosting pair: Nataša Pirc Musar and Sandi Salkič.

In 1998, the show was redesigned and began 15 minutes earlier, at 7:15 pm.

In September 1999, the show had a 47% audience share, and with it, overcame the main news on TV SLO 1 – the first channel of the public service broadcaster RTV SLO, TV Dnevnik. From that day, 24UR became the most watched news programme in Slovenia. It still holds this title until this day.

Matjaž Tanko, a Slovenian hosting legend, along with Tamara Vonta came as a new hosting pair in January 2001.

From 2003, the show lasts for one full hour, from 7 to 8 pm.

On POP TV's 13th birthday (15 December 2008), the studio and the show's design were updated to the most modern technology available at that time. The show started to air in HD quality and 16:9 aspect ratio.

==== Segments on 24UR ====
POP IN is a segment focusing on news from the world of entertainment and popular culture. It airs from Monday to Friday and is around five minutes long. On Sundays, the segment is 10–15 minutes long. It was introduced in 1996.

Vizita is a medical segment which is running from 1995. It is a five minute long documentary/info segment about health and medicine. It is aired every Friday.

TV Klub ("TV Club") was a debate segment. It aired every Sunday from 2003 onwards and lasted from 10 to 15 minutes. The hosts were Špela Šipek and other 24UR news show hosts. It was replaced by 24UR Fokus in the beginning of 2016.

24UR Inšpektor is a segment, hosted by the same host as the main news show 24UR that day, and lasts from 5 to 10 minutes. It airs weekly every Saturday. It is a segment focusing on investigative journalism. It was introduced in the summer of 2015.

24UR Fokus is a segment focusing on investigative journalism, which replaced TV Klub in the beginning of 2016. The host of the show is the same as the host of 24UR that day. It airs weekly every Sunday and lasts from 10 to 12 minutes.

24UR popoldne was introduced in 2008. It is a 15–20 minute long afternoon news show which airs between 4:45 pm and 5:15 pm on weekdays.

24UR zvečer was introduced in 2007. It is a 15–20 minute long evening news show which airs between 10 pm and 11 pm on weekdays. Currently, the show is hosted by Uroš Slak from Monday to Thursday.

24UR vreme is a weather broadcast lasting for five minutes before the main 24UR news show at 6:55 pm every day. It premiered in 2008.

Every Tuesday, viewers are offered the weekly investigative news show Preverjeno!, which premiered in the autumn of 2001. The show is hosted by Alenka Arko.

The channel also aired a weekly news debate show called Trenja ("Frictions") which ran from the autumn of 2002 to the spring of 2009. The show had guests (usually politicians or political commentators) debating over various topics, ranging from politics to popular culture and taboo topics. The show, which aired every Thursday, was hosted by one of the best known Slovenian journalists and TV hosts, Uroš Slak. After the show was cancelled, Uroš went on to host the daily news show Svet which airs on POP TV's sister channel Kanal A.

24UR ob enih ("24Hours at 1pm") is a one-hour-long show which aired from Monday to Friday at 1 pm. The hosts were the same as the hosts of the main 24UR show. It began airing in the summer of 2010 and was cancelled in 2013 due to financial reasons.

Epilog ("Epilogue"), similar to Trenja, aired between the spring of 2014 and the autumn of 2015. It was hosted by Maja Sodja.

POP TV also hosts 3–4 pre-election debates every Slovenian election year for parliamentary, presidential and local elections. The hosts of the debates are usually the hosts of the main news show.

== Entertainment programs ==
=== 1995–1999 ===
When POP TV commenced its official broadcasts, it instantly became a go-to channel for entertainment in Slovenia. In the early years, they aired a quiz show called POP Kviz (1996), music show Med prijatelji (1995), and daily breakfast show Dobro jutro, Slovenija (1996) from studios in Ljubljana and Maribor. The channel also broadcast Viktorji (1997–2010), an annual Slovenian awards show for media achievements and accomplishments in popular culture, along with the beauty pageant competition ceremony Miss Slovenija (1996–2010) for Miss World.

In the following years, the channel introduced music shows POP party (1997) and Super POP (1998), shows Pop'N'Roll (1999) and Pod srečno zvezdo (1999), and game show 1, 2, 3, kdo dobi? (1999–2001). Brez zavor / Brez zapor (1997–1998) was a new weekly music talk show in the style of Late Show With David Letterman that premiered in 1997. In 1999, POP TV began to air their first own-produced sitcom, TV dober dan (1999–2002), which was an instant hit, and lasted for six full seasons.

=== 2000–2006 ===
In the beginning of the 21st century, POP TV launched the Slovenian version of Who Wants To Be a Millionaire, called Lepo je biti milijonar (hosted by Jonas Žnidaršič and later Boštjan Romih) (2000–2005), which lasted for eleven seasons. The sports show for students ŠKL was also introduced.

In the next few years, a new Slovenian drama series Pod eno streho (2002–2004) and a hidden camera show Pazi, kamera! (2003–2004) were introduced. A new locally produced sitcom Trafika (2003) also premiered only one season.

In 2004, POP TV introduced their first reality show. Sanjski moški (2004) was the Slovenian version of The Bachelor, and lasted for one season. In the same year, Naša mala klinika (2004–2007), a new Slovenian sitcom, was introduced and lasted for seven full seasons. The sitcom was watched on average by 300.000 people against 2 million people, which is the population of Slovenia. In the next year, two new reality shows were introduced: Sanjska ženska (2005–2006), a local version of The Bachelorette which lasted for two seasons, and a Slovenian version of reality show The Bar, called Bar (2005–2006), which lasted also for two seasons. A hidden-camera show called Oprostite, prosim!, Vzemi ali pusti (2005–2008), local version of Deal or No Deal and music show Raketa pod kozolcem (2005–2006), also premiered in 2005. POP TV also co-produced a new crime series named Balkan Inc. (2006), with Nova TV and TV Pink.

=== 2007–2011 ===
In 2007, the channel aired the first season of the Slovenian adaptation of the reality show The Farm, Kmetija (2007–2008, 2011, 2017). Three seasons of the show aired, before it was announced again for autumn of 2017, after it aired on POP TV's rival Planet TV between 2014 and 2016, for three seasons. One celebrity season of the show aired, called Kmetija Slavnih (2009). The same year, a show loosely based on the popular American show Saturday Night Live, premiered. Five seasons of A's ti tud not padu?! (2007–2009) were shown. Desetka (2008) was a cooking show introduced in 2008, along with a new Slovenian sitcom called Lepo je biti sosed (2008–2011), which lasted for six seasons.

POP TV brought the popular "Got Talent" series to Slovenia in 2010. The Slovenian version was named Slovenija ima talent (2010–2011, 2013–2016), and broke all viewership records. The finale of the first season was the top-watched show of the last ten years in Slovenia. The show aired for six seasons, until the autumn of 2016, when the last season was on program. In 2010, the channel also launched the celebrity version of Slovenian adaption of Big Brother, called Big Brother Slavnih. Cooking show Ljubezen skozi želodec (2009–2011), Slovenian sitcom Trdoglavci (2011), and Slovenian version of Minute to Win it called Minuta do zmage (2011–2012), were new shows that aired.

=== 2012–2015 ===
In the autumn of 2012, POP TV aired the first and only season of the Slovenian version of the popular singing competition show X Factor, X Faktor Slovenija (2012). In the same year, the new original reality cooking show Gostilna išče šefa (2012–2015) started. Four seasons of the show aired. Two new Slovenian series aired: Čista desetka (2012), a new Slovenian sitcom that aired for two seasons, and Na terapiji (2012), a drama series that had actually premiered on POP TV's new sister channel, POP BRIO, a year before. Another new traveling show called Okrog sveta do srca (2012) was introduced in the same year.

The next year started with Vid in Pero šov (2013–2014), a new comedy show, along with dog training show Pozor, priden pes! (2013–2014). Both lasted for three seasons. In autumn, a second comedy show premiered, called Je bella cesta (2013–2014), which lasted for two seasons. Between 2013 and 2015, POP TV introduced a handful of cooking shows that lasted for between one and three seasons. Those were Zabeljeno po ameriško (2013), Ana kuha (2013–2014), Okusi brez meja (2013–2014), Skriti šef (2014), Gorazdova slaščičarna (2014), Zdravo, Tereza! (2015) and Polona ga žge (2015–present).

In the beginning of 2014, the channel aired a new Slovenian sitcom Mamin dan (2014), which lasted for one season. The Slovenian version of Your Face Sounds Familiar called Znan obraz ima svoj glas (2014–present), also premiered and is currently in its fourth season. TOP 4 s Tjašo Kokalj (2014–2015), a beauty/business reality show, moved from Kanal A to POP TV, and aired for two more seasons. Vrtičkanje, a gardening show, also premiered, and aired its fourth season in 2017.

In the spring of 2015, POP TV introduced two new reality shows: Popolna poroka (2015), a wedding reality show, which lasted for one season, and the Slovenian version of MasterChef series, called MasterChef Slovenija (2015–present), which will air its fourth season in the spring of 2018. It also aired a new wish fulfilling show, Dan najlepših sanj (2015–present), which was in its fourth season as of September 2017. Usodno vino was POP TV's first daily soap opera, was introduced in the autumn of 2015, and aired its fourth and final season in the spring of 2017. The channel also aired the first season of Na žaru: Z Ladom Bizovičarjem (2015–2016), which was later renewed for its second season, in the summer of 2017. The show is based on the popular comedy Roast. The third episode of this show, where popular Slovenian comedians and TV personalities roasted the current president of Republic of Slovenia – Borut Pahor, was the second best watched show in the last fifteen years on Slovenian television channels.

=== 2016 ===
POP TV began the year with the richest home production season in the channel's history. New seasons of previously aired shows were announced, along with five new self-produced shows. In the middle of February, the second season of the daily soap opera Usodno vino premiered, and a new family cooking competition show began its run – Moja mama kuha bolje!. Dan najlepših sanj returned to its channel in the end of February for second season. New seasons of Polona ga žge and Vrtičkanje started airing again. The third season of the beloved music competition show Znan obraz ima svoj glas began on March 6. The new locally produced sitcom Takle mamo was introduced, but was moved to the autumn of 2016 after only four episodes aired. In the middle of March, the second season of MasterChef Slovenija began airing. This season had eight celebrity and eight regular contestants. On Friday of the same week, a new reality show was introduced – Bitka parkov. Two new shows, Delovna akcija and Hipnoza: Dobra zabava are yet to be introduced to the program.

Announced shows

POP TV started collecting applications for the first season of the Slovenian version of the popular reality show Survivor, called Survivor Slovenija: Filipini. The show was set to begin on production during the summer, and to air in the autumn of 2016. In the second half of March, POP TV also started collecting applications for Slovenian version of Farmer Wants a Wife, called Ljubezen po domače, which is set to premiere that autumn. In April, the channel started collecting applications for a new original business reality show, Štartaj Slovenija, where people can present their new products that they made. If their product was chosen as the product with the most potential to be a hit on the market, they would be given a free promotion on all PRO PLUS channels, and a one-year selling contract with Slovenian branch of Spar retail chain. POP TV also announced that they would air the Slovenian version of Strictly Come Dancing, called Zvezde plešejo, in the autumn of 2016. In May, applications for the sixth season of Slovenian version of the "Got Talent" series – Slovenija ima talent – were opened.

== Sport programs ==
Between 1997 and 2010, POP TV broadcast Formula One races. The commentator was Miran Ališič, who is very recognizable for his voice. In 2010, RTV SLO bought the rights for the broadcast.

In 2002, POP TV broadcast the matches of 2002 World Cup in collaboration with its sister channel Kanal A.

In March 1996, POP TV started to air a weekly sports talkshow Športna scena ("Sport Scene"). The show was hosted by Stane Kavčič, Bogdan Barovič and co-host Vesna Dolen. In February of the next year, the hosting was taken over by Gašper Bolhar and Nataša Briški. In August 1997, Bolhar left the show. Until 2003, Briški hosted the show alone for six years. In 2003, she was replaced by Miran Tišič who hosted the show for three more years, until 2006, when the show was cancelled. Among other popular athletes, the show's guests included Mika Häkkinen, 1998 and 1999 Formula 1 Champion in September 1999.

== Foreign programs ==
=== Movies ===
POP TV airs top Hollywood blockbusters from all major film studios (20th Century Fox, Warner Bros. Pictures, Paramount Pictures, Universal Pictures, Walt Disney Pictures and Columbia Pictures) and movies of Slovenian and former Yugoslavian production.

=== Series ===
POP TV airs top series of American and European production, mainly focusing on Hollywood produced series.

House, Desperate Housewives, Dexter, Lost, Sex and the City, Dirty Sexy Money, Monk, CSI, CSI: Miami, CSI: New York, ER, Friends, Kommisar Rex, Law and Order: Special Victims Unit, Grey's Anatomy, Ally McBeal, Fringe, Ugly Betty, Burn Notice, The Mentalist, Breaking Bad, House of Cards, Downton Abbey, Castle, Bones, and The Blacklist are some hit series that have aired on the channel.

The Oprah Winfrey Show, Rachael Ray, The Jerry Springer Show, Ricki Lake and Dr. Oz Show are popular American shows that have aired on the channel.

=== Soap operas / telenovelas ===
In 1997, the channel started to air a Mexican telenovela, Esmeralda. The series was a huge hit and from then on, the weekday afternoons on the channel have been reserved for telenovelas.

The channel airs soap operas from many South American countries, Spain, Mexico, Turkey, Germany, Austria and Croatia.

=== Animated series and children's shows ===
In 2002, POP TV launched its first cartoon block called Ringa-raja on weekend mornings. The program lasted until 2010 when it was renamed Moj-Moj. In 2013, the name of the block was changed again, to Oto čira čara. The block has that name until this day.

SpongeBob SquarePants, Ben 10, Bakugan Battle Brawlers, Bob the Builder, Winx Club, Roary the Racing Car, Power Rangers, Star Wars: The Clone Wars and LazyTown are some of the many cartoons and kids' shows that aired in the cartoon blocks on POP TV.

=== Special films ===
November 15, 2021 they are Spirit Untamed and Peter Rabbit 2

== Current programming (July 2022) ==
=== Nationally created shows ===
Original title	Format	Day
24ur	daily news	every day
24ur popoldne	afternoon news	weekdays
24ur zvečer	nightly news	weekdays
24ur vreme	weather broadcast	every day
Preverjeno	current affairs magazine	Tuesday
Eurojackpot	lottery drawing	Tuesday and Friday

=== Nationally created series ===
Title	Format	Day
sl: Sekirca v med	soap opera	weekdays

=== Internationally created series ===
Original title	Slovenian title	Day	Country
Galaxy Park	Junaki zabaviščnega parka	weekdays	(Belgium) (Netherlands)
Lethal Weapon	Smrtonosno orožje	Monday – Thursday	(United States)
House of Cards	Hiša iz kart	Monday – Thursday	(United States)
Vikings	Vikingi	Monday – Thursday	(Canada) (Republic of Ireland)
Gotham	Gotham	Monday – Thursday	(United States)
Night Shift	Nočna izmena	Monday – Thursday	(United States)
Chicago Fire	Gasilci v Chicagu	Monday – Thursday	(United States)
The Starter Wife	Sveže ločena	weekends	(United States)
Die Bergretter	Gorski reševalec	weekends	(Germany) (Austria)

=== Internationally created shows ===
There are no internationally created shows currently being broadcast on POP TV.

=== Internationally created telenovelas / soap operas ===
Original title	Slovenian title	Day	Country
Marido en alquiler	Zmorem sama	weekdays	(United States)
Fazilet Hanım ve Kızları	Pohlepna gospa Fazilet	weekdays	(Turkey)
La mujer del Vendaval	Dedinja Vendavala	weekdays	(Mexico)
Siyah Beyaz Ask	Lepotica in zver	weekdays	(Turkey)

=== Internationally created animated series ===
Original title	Slovenian title	Dates	Day	Country
Tickety Toc	Tika taka	?	Weekdays	(United States) (United Kingdom) (South Korea)
Maya the Bee	Čebelica Maja	?	Weekdays	(Germany) (United States) (France) (United Kingdom)
Fetch! with Ruff Ruffman		March 13, 2021	Weekends	(United States)
Super Wings	Super krila	?	Weekdays	(United States) (China) (South Korea)
Parker Baskup – Tony Parker	Pod košem	?	Weekdays	(France)
Poko	Poko	?	Weekdays	(Canada)
Winx Club	Winx klub	?	Weekdays	(Italy)
Conni	Kaja	?	Weekends	(Germany)
Vic the Viking	Viking Viki	?	Weekends	(France) (Australia)
Oddbods	Oddbods	?	Weekends	(United Kingdom) (Singapore)
Horrid Henry	Grozni Gašper	?	Weekends	(United Kingdom)
Phineas and Ferb	Phineas in Ferb	?	Weekends	(United States)
Peter Pan	Peter Pan	?	Weekends	(France) (India) (Germany) (Italy)
Pinkalicious & Peterrific	Rozailla	May 31, 2021	Weekends	(United States)
Molly of Denali	Molly iz Denalija	November 15, 2021	Weekends	(United States)
Nini Patalol	Nina in prijatelji	?	Weekends	(France)
Regal Academy	Kraljevska akademija	?	Weekends	(Italy)
Le Ranch	Skrivnostni ranč	?	Weekends	(France)
Ben 10	Ben 10	?	Weekends	(United States)
Yo-Kai Watch	Čudežna ura Yo Kai	?	Weekends	(Japan)
Teenage Mutant Ninja Turtles	Ninja želve	?	Weekends	(United States)

=== Primetime schedule (week of 8–14 April 2019) ===
Day	6:00 pm	6:30 pm	7:00 pm	7:30 pm	8:00 pm	8:30 pm	9:00 pm	9:30 pm	10:00 pm	10:30 pm
Monday	Ko zadiši ljubezen Dolunay; Turkish drama series		24UR daily news		Reka ljubezni 4th season Slovenian soap opera		Gorski zdravnik Der Bergdoktor; Germany series		24UR zvečer evening news	Lethal Weapon; American action series
Tuesday	Ko zadiši ljubezen Dolunay; Turkish drama series		24UR daily news		Reka ljubezni 4th season Slovenian soap opera		Gorski zdravnik Der Bergdoktor; Germany series		Preverjeno current affairs magazine	
Wednesday	Ko zadiši ljubezen Dolunay; Turkish drama series		24UR daily news		Reka ljubezni 4th season Slovenian soap opera		MasterChef Slovenia; 5th season Slovenian version of MasterChef series		24UR zvečer evening news	Chicago Fire; American action series
Thursday	Ko zadiši ljubezen Dolunay; Turkish drama series		24UR daily news		Reka ljubezni 4th season Slovenian soap opera		MasterChef Slovenia; 5th season Slovenian version of MasterChef series			24UR zvečer evening news
Friday	Ko zadiši ljubezen Dolunay; Turkish drama series		24UR daily news		Ljubezen po domače 3rd season of the Slovenian version of Farmer Wants a Wife series		evening movie			
Saturday	Preverjeno current affairs magazine (repetition)		24UR daily news		Ljubezen po domače 3rd season of the Slovenian version of Farmer Wants a Wife series		Delavna akcija 2nd season Slovenian version of Extreme Makeover: Home Edition series		evening movie	
Sunday	Mali Šef Slovenije cooking show		24UR daily news		Zvezde plešejo 3rd season of the Slovenian version of Dancing with the Stars series					

== Upcoming shows (January 2019) ==
=== Nationally created shows ===
Title	Format	Launch
Reka ljubezni	4th season of the Slovenian soap opera	spring 2019
Zvezde plešejo	3rd season of the Slovenian version of Dancing with the Stars series	spring 2019
Ljubezen po domače	3rd season of the Slovenian version of Farmer Wants a Wife series	spring 2019
MasterChef Slovenija	5th season Slovenian version of MasterChef series	spring 2019
Mali šef Slovenije	1th season Slovenian version of ?	spring 2019
Delovna akcija	2nd season Slovenian version of Extreme Makeover: Home Edition series	spring 2019
Najini mostovi	1th season of the Slovenian soap opera	autumn 2019
Znan obraz ima svoj glas	5th season of singing competition show	autumn 2019
Kmetija	8th regular season of the Slovenian version of The Farm series	autumn 2019
Štartaj Slovenija	4th season of business reality show	autumn 2019
Dan najlepših sanj	6th season of wish fulfilling show	autumn 2019

==== Animated ====
Titles	Titles in Slovenia	Air dates
Clifford the Big Red Dog (2019)	Clifford Veliki rdeči pes	October 7, 2022
Alma's Way	Alma Pot	October 7, 2022
Xavier Riddle and the Secret Museum		October 8, 2022
Hero Elementary		October 8, 2022
The VeggieTales Show	TBA	October 12, 2022
Donkey Hodie		Fall 2022
Rosie's Rules	TBA	TBA

== Past programming (July 2022) ==
=== Nationally created shows ===
==== Reality shows ====
Show	English translation	Original version	Seasons	Format	Aired	Presenter(s)	Notes
Ljubezen po domače	Love Peasant's Way	Farmer Wants a Wife	2	love reality show	2017(1); 2018(2)	Anja Postružnik Koren	
Zvezde plešejo	Stars are Dancing	Strictly Come Dancing	2	dancing competition show	2017(1); 2018(2)	Peter Poles & Tara Zupančič	
Suvivor Slovenija: Filipini	Survivor Slovenia: Philippines	Survivor	1	reality show	2016(1)	Miran Stanovnik	
Štartaj Slovenija	Start Slovenia	original format	3	business reality show	2016(1); 2017(2); 2018(3)	Matija Goljar	
MasterChef Slovenija	MasterChef Slovenia	MasterChef	4	cooking show	2015(1); 2016(2); 2017(3); 2018(4)	no presenter(s)	
Popolna poroka	Perfect Wedding	original format	1	reality competition show	2015(1)	Boštjan Romih	
Znan obraz ima svoj glas	Familiar Face Has Its Voice	Your Face Sounds Familiar	4	music show	2014(1); 2015(2); 2016(3); 2017(4)	Denis Avdić	
TOP 4 s Tjašo Kokalj	TOP 4 With Tjaša Kokalj	original format	2 (3)	beauty/business show	2014(2); 2015(3)	Tjaša Kokalj	first season aired on sister channel Kanal A
Gostilna išče šefa	Restaurant Is Searching For Boss	original format	4	cooking reality show	2012(1); 2013(2); 2014(3); 2015(4)	Lili Žagar (1–3); Boštjan Romih (4)	
X Faktor	X Factor	X Factor	1	talent show	2012	Vid Valič & Peter Poles	
Slovenija ima talent	Slovenia's Got Talent	Got Talent	7	talent show	2010(1); 2011(2); 2013(3); 2014(4); 2015(5); 2016(6); 2018(7)	Vid Valič & Peter Poles (1–2 & 4–5); Jože Robežnik & Matej Puc (3); Vid Valič & Domen Valič (6); Domen Vačlič & Sašo Stare (7)	
Big Brother Slavnih	Celebrity Big Brother	Big Brother	1	reality show	2010	Nina Osenar	regular seasons are airing on Kanal A
Kmetija Slavnih	Celebrity Farm	The Farm	1	reality show on farm	2009	Anja Križnik Tomažin	celebrity season of The Farm
Kmetija	The Farm	The Farm	5	reality show on farm	2007(1); 2008(2); 2011(3); 2017(4); 2018(5)	Špela Močnik (1–2); Lili Žagar (3); Natalija Bratkovič (4,5)	third season of the show was called "Kmetija išče lastnika". / "The Farm Is Searching For an Owner" from 2014 to 2016, The Farm moved to POP TV's rival channel Planet TV for three seasons, with an undertitle "Nov začetek" / New Beginning
Bar	The Bar	The Bar	2	reality show in a bar	2005 (1); 2006 (2)	Bastjan Kepic	
Sanjska ženska	The Woman Of Your Dreams	The Bachelorette	2	dating reality show	2005 (1); 2006 (2)	Robert Erjavec	
Sanjski moški	The Man Of Your Dreams	The Bachelor	1	dating reality show	2004	Robert Erjavec	

==== Game shows ====
Show	English translation	Original version	Seasons	Format	Aired	Presenter(s)	Notes
Hipnoza: Dobra zabava	Hypnosis: Good Fun	You're Back in the Room	1	game show	2017 (1)	Boštjan Romih	/
Bitka parov	The Battle Of The Couples	Power Couple	1	game show	2016 (1)	Klemen Bučan	/
Minuta do zmage	Minute to Victory	Minute To Win It	3	game show	2011 (1 & 2); 2012 (3)	Bojan Emeršič	/
Vzemi ali pusti	Take It Or Leave It	Deal or No Deal	7	game show	2005–2008	Bojan Emeršič	/
Lepo je biti milijonar – Kviz z Jonasom Lepo je biti milijonar	It's Nice To Be A Millionaire	Who Wants to Be a Millionaire?	11	quiz show	2000–2005	Jonas Žnidaršič (1–3); Boštjan Romih (4–5)	Jonas Žnidaršič, the first presenter, was named one of the best presenters of the show in the World the show moved to RTV SLO and was renamed to "Milijonar". The first episode was on 1 March 2007, and was once again hosted by Jonas. It was cancelled after only one season on 1 January 2008.
1,2,3, kdo dobi?	1,2,3, Who Will Win?	original format	?	game show	1998–2001	Robert Erjavec & Saša Einsidler	/
Pop kviz	Pop Quiz	original format	?	quiz show	1996	Janez Dolinar; Saša Einsidler	/

==== News / documentary shows ====
Show	English translation	Seasons	Format	Aired	Presenter(s)	Notes
Epilog	Epilogue	4	debate news/documentary show	2014 (1 & 2); 2015 (3 & 4)	Maja Sodja	
24UR ob enih	24HOURS At 1 pm	/	an hour long news show	2010–2013	24UR show hosts	
Trenja	Friction	/	debate news/documentary show	2002–2009	Uroš Slak	
Preverjeno!	Confirmed!	14	news/documentary magazine	2001–present	Alenka Arko	A Croatian version of the show also airs on Nova TV, called Provjereno!.
Športna scena	Sport Scene	around 10	sports debate news show	1996–2006	Stane Kavčič & Bogdan Barovič (1996) Gašper Bolhar (1997) Nataša Briški (1997–2003) Miran Tišič (2003–2006)	
Argument	Argument	/	debate show	1996	Drago Balažič	
Športni krog	Sports Circle	/	sports news show	1996	?	
Obraz tedna	Face Of The Week	/	documentary magazine	1995	Zoran Turk	

==== Comedy shows ====
Show	English translation	Seasons	Format	Aired	Presenter(s)	Notes
Je bella cesta	It's A White Road	2	sketch music show	2013 (1); 2014 (2)	Klemen Slakonja	/
Vid in Pero Šov	Vid & Pero Show	3	comedy music talk show	2013 (1 & 2); 2014 (3)	Vid Valič & Peter Poles	/
As ti tud not padu?!	Did You Also Fall In It?!	5	comedy music talk show	2007 (1); 2008 (2 & 3); 2009 (4 & 5)	Jurij Zrnec & Lado Bizovičar	This show is loosely based on Saturday Night Live.
Oprostite, prosim!	Excuse Me Please!	1	hidden camera talk show	2005	Saša Einsidler	This show is loosely based on the British show Remotely Funny.
Brez zavor / Brez zapor	Without Brakes/ Without Obstruction	?	music talk show	1997–1998	Jonas Žnidaršič	This show is loosely based on Late Show with David Letterman.

==== Cooking shows ====
Show	English translation	Seasons	Format	Aired	Presenter(s)	Notes
Moja mama kuha bolje!	My Mum Cooks Better!	2	family cooking competition show	2016 (1 & 2)	Jan Bučar	Slovenian version of Mi madre cocina mejor que la tuya
Zdravo, Tereza!	Hello, Tereza!	3	vegan cooking show	2015 (1); 2017 (2); 2018 (3)	Tereza Poljanič	The show was filmed in New Zealand, where Tereza is living.
Polona ga žge	Polona Roasts It	2	family cooking show	2015 (1); 2016 (2)	Polona Požgan	/
Gorazdova slaščičarna	Gorazd's Confectionary	1	dessert cooking show	2014	Gorazd Potočnik	/
Skriti šef	Hidden Chef	1	celebrity cooking show	2014	no presenter(s)	This show is the Slovenian version of The Restaurant.
Okusi brez meja	Flavours Without Borders	2	cooking show	2013 (1); 2014 (2)	Matevž Slokar & Joe Gray	/
Ana kuha	Ana Cooks	3	cooking show	2013 (1 & 2); 2014 (3)	Ana Žontar Kristanc	/
Zabeljeno po ameriško	Seasoned American Way	1	cooking show	2013	Cassie Parsons & Lenny Russo	/
Ljubezen skozi želodec	Love Through The Stomach	4	family cooking show	2009 (1); 2010 (2 & 3); 2011 (4)	Luka Novak & Valentina Smej Novak	/
Desetka	Ten	2	cooking show	2008 (1 & 2)	Urban Demšar & Boštjan Napotnik	/

==== Special events ====
Show	English translation	Seasons	Format	Aired	Presenter(s)	Notes
Na žaru: Z Ladom Bizovičarjem	Roast: With Lado Bizovičar	2 (6 episodes)	roast comedy event	2015–2016 (1); 2017 (1)	Lado Bizovičar	This show is based on the popular comedy Roast.
Moto GP	Moto GP races	4	sport event	2007–2010	Gaber Keržišnik	moved to Kanal A after the 2010 season
Viktorji	Viktor Awards	14	Annual Slovenian awards for media achievements and accomplishments in popular culture	1997–2010	various presenters	moved to RTV SLO after the 2009 awards
Formula 1	Formula 1 races	15	sport event	1996–2010	Miran Ališič	moved to RTV SLO after the 2010 season
Miss Slovenije	Miss Slovenia for Miss World ceremony	15	beauty pageant ceremony	1996–2010	various presenters	/

==== Other shows ====
Show	English translation	Seasons	Format	Aired	Presenter(s)	Notes
Delovna akcija	Working Action	1	Extreme Makeover: Home Edition	2018 (1)	Ana Praznik	/
Avto karaoke	Car Karaoke	1	Carpool Karaoke	2017 (1)	Lado Bizovičar	/
Dan najlepših sanj	Day Of The Most Beautiful Dreams	5	wish fulfilling show	2015 (1); 2016 (2 & 3); 2017 (4); 2018 (5)	Peter Poles	/
Vrtičkanje	Gardening	5	gardening show	2014 (1); 2015 (2 & 3); 2017 (4); 2018 (5)	Metka & Tina	/
Pozor, priden pes!	Caution, Good Dog!	3	show about disciplining pet dogs	2013 (1 & 2); 2014 (3)	Jure Pribičević & David Pogačnik	/
Okrog sveta do srca	Around The World To The Heart	1	trip documentary	2012	Nina Ivanič	/
Raketa pod kozolcem	Rocket Under Hayrack	?	Slovenian traditional music (polka) show	2006	Boštjan Romih	/
ŠKL	School Basketball League	11	sports show	2000–2010	various presenters	moved to Kanal A in 2011
Pod srečno zvezdo	Under Lucky Star	?	show	1999–?	Saša Einsidler & Robert Erjavec	/
Pop'n'Roll	Pop'N'Roll	?	show	1999–?	Janja Sodja	/
Super POP	Super POP	?	Slovenian version of Wetten, dass..?	1998	Stojan Auer	/
POP party	POP Party	?	music show	1997–?	Anja Rupel	/
Dobro jutro, Slovenija	Good Morning, Slovenia	?	morning show	1996–?	Katja Tratnik	/
Med prijatelji	Among Friends	?	traditional Slovenian (polka) music show	1995–?	Betka Šuhel	/
POP 30	POP 30	?	music show	1995–?	Janja Sodja & Igor Oblak	/

==== Series ====
Title	English translation	Genre	Seasons	Aired	Notes
Reka ljubezni	River Of Love	soap opera	3	2017 (1); 2018 (2 & 3)	/
Takle mamo	It's Like This	sitcom	1	2016	the series is a Slovenian adaptation of Spanish sitcom Scènes de ménages. and was filmed in Croatia, where "Samo ti pričaj", Croatian version of the same sitcom, was also filmed
Usodno vino	Fatal Wine	soap opera	4	2015 (1); 2016 (2 & 3); 2017 (4)	the series is a Slovenian adaptation of very successful Slovak soap opera called "Búrlivé víno", which is airing on Markíza
Mamin dan	Mum's Day	sitcom	1	2014	the series is a Slovenian adaptation of Israeli sitcom "Mother's Day"
Čista desetka	Perfect Ten	sitcom	2	2012 (1 & 2)	/
Na terapiji	On Therapy	drama	1	2012	The series premiered in autumn of 2011 on POP TV's sister channel POP BRIO, and it's a Slovenian adaptation of the Israeli series BeTipul.
Trdoglavci	Hardheads	sitcom	1	2011	The series was cancelled after first season due to high production costs.
Lepo je biti sosed	It's Nice To Be A Neighbour	sitcom	6	2008 (1); 2009 (2 & 3); 2010 (4 & 5); 2011 (6)	The first three seasons of the series are the Slovenian adaptation of Slovak sitcom Susedia, which was airing on Markíza.
Balkan Inc.	Balkan Inc.	crime	1	2006	The series was made in co-production with Croatian Nova TV and Serbian TV Pink.
Naša mala klinika	Our Little Clinic	sitcom	7	2004 (1); 2005 (2 & 3); 2006 (4 & 5); 2007 (6 & 7)	Croatian (for Nova TV) and Serbian (for B92) versions of this series were filmed in the same studio, by the same crew and director Branko Đurić.
Trafika	The Newsstand	sitcom	1	2003	/
Pod eno streho	Under One Roof	drama, sitcom	4	2002 (1); 2003 (2 & 3); 2004 (4)	/
TV dober dan	TV Good Day	sitcom	6	1999 (1); 2000 (2 & 3); 2001 (4 & 5); 2002 (6)	The series was adapted by Nova TV for Croatia, where it was called Bumerang.

==== Canceled nationally created shows ====
- Zamenjajmo ženi (Slovenian version of Wife Swap)
  - 2007
- Gasilci: Enota 14 (original reality documentary series about firefighters)
  - spring 2015
- Ste pametnejši od petošolca? (Slovenian version of Are You Smarter Than a 5th Grader?)
  - 2006

=== Weekend morning cartoon block ===
- Ringa raja
  - 2002–2010
- Moj-Moj
  - 2010–2013
- Oto čira čara
  - 2013–present

=== Internationally created shows ===
==== Series ====
- 3 Lbs.
- 30 Rock
- 7th Heaven
- 90210
- Absolute Power
- Agatha Christie's Partners in Crime
- Agatha Christie's Poirot
- Alias
- Alien Nation
- Ally McBeal
- Always Greener
- The Amazing Mrs Pritchard
- Angela's Eyes
- Angie
- Army Wives
- As If
- Baywatch
- Beach Girls
- Mr. Bean
- The Beast
- Beautiful People
- Bette
- Big Shots
- Bionic Woman
- The Black Donnellys
- The Blacklist
- Blessed
- Blue Bloods
- Body of Proof
- Bones
- The Book of Daniel
- Boston Legal
- Breaking Bad
- Breakout Kings
- Brotherhood
- Brothers & Sisters
- Burn Notice
- Californication
- Cane
- Canterbury's Law
- Cashmere Mafia
- Castle
- Carrie and Barry
- Chaos
- The Chase
- Chicago Hope
- Chuck
- The Cleaner
- Close to Home
- Cold Case
- Commander in Chief
- Cougar Town
- Crusoe
- CSI: NY
- Cursed
- Damages
- Desperate Housewives
- Dexter
- Diagnosis: Murder
- Die Kommissarin
- Dinotopia
- Dirt
- Dirty Sexy Money
- Dolmen
- Due South
- Durham County
- Early Edition
- Eleventh Hour
- Eli Stone
- Emily's Reasons Why Not
- ER
- Everwood
- Fairly Legal
- Franklin & Bash
- Friends
- Fringe
- A Gifted Man
- The Glades
- Going to California
- The Golden Girls
- The Golden Hour
- Grumpy old men
- Grumpy old women
- Hallo, Onkel Doc!
- Harper's Island
- Heartland
- Hellcats
- Help
- Hercules: The Legendary Journeys
- Hex
- Home Again
- House
- Hotel Babylon
- Hot in Cleveland
- Human Target
- Hung
- The Incredible Journey of Mary Bryant
- In Justice
- Into the West
- Journeyman
- Judging Amy
- Justice
- Karen Sisco
- Keen Eddie
- Kevin Hill
- Kidnapped
- Kings
- Knight Rider
- L.A. Doctors
- Law & Order: Special Victims Unit
- Life
- The Life and Times of Vivienne Vyle
- Life is Wild
- Lipstick Jungle
- The Lying Game
- Major Crimes
- Malcolm in the Middle
- Men in Trees
- The Mentalist
- Midsomer Murders
- The Mommies
- Monk
- My Own Worst Enemy
- Mysterious Ways
- The Naked Truth
- Necessary Roughness
- North of 60
- NYPD Blue
- Ocean Girl
- Oh, Grow Up
- Painkiller Jane
- The Palace
- Pensacola: Wings of Gold
- Person of Interest
- Political Animals
- Practice
- Presidio Med
- The Pretender
- Primeval
- Prison Break
- Private Practice
- Profiler
- Providence
- Psych
- Raines
- Renegade
- Rennschwein Rudi Rüssel
- Revenge
- The Riches
- Robert Kennedy and His Times
- Rubicon
- Rules of Engagement
- Runaway
- Sex and the City
- Sex, Love & Secrets
- Shark
- She Spies
- The Single Guy
- Casebook of Sherlock Holmes
- Side Order of Life
- Sleeper Cell
- Snoops
- Standoff
- Star Stories
- The State Within
- Storm of the Century
- Strong Medicine
- Studio 60 on the Sunset Strip
- Stupid Stupid Man
- Suburban Shootout
- Suits
- Superstorm
- Surface
- Sweet Valley High
- Swingtown
- Taken
- Terminator: The Sarah Connor Chronicles
- That '80s Show
- The Thin Blue Line
- Tin Man
- To the Ends of the Earth
- Traveler
- The Triangle
- The Tudors
- Ugly Betty
- Vincent
- Walker Texas Ranger
- Water Rats
- The West Wing
- Wild at Heart
- Wild Card
- Wildfire
- Without a Trace
- The X-Files

==== Animated series ====
- 3-2-1 Penguins!
- 64 Zoo Lane
- Action Man
- The Adventures of Paddington Bear
- Animaniacs
- The Adventures of Chuck and Friends
- Altair in Starland
- American Dragon: Jake Long
- Angelina Ballerina: The Next Steps
- Astro Boy
- Avatar: The Last Airbender
- Avengers: Earth's Mightiest Heroes
- Baby Looney Tunes
- Bakugan Battle Brawlers
- Bakugan Battle Brawlers: New Vestroia
- Bakugan Battle Brawlers: Gundalian Invaders
- Barbie
- Basketeers
- B-Daman Crossfire
- Ben 10
- Ben 10
- Ben 10: Alien Force
- Beany and Cecil
- Benjamin Blümchen
- Bernard Bear
- Beyblade
- Beyblade: Metal Fusion
- Beyblade Burst
- Bigfoot Presents: Meteor and the Mighty Monster Trucks
- Die Biene Maja
- Bibi Blocksberg
- Blaze and the Monster Machines
- Bob the Builder
- Boom & Reds
- Bratz
- Brilliant Creatures
- Budgie the Little Helicopter
- Busy Buses
- Camp Lazlo
- Captain Tsubasa
- Chloe's Closet
- Cotoons
- Chuggington
- Class of 3000
- Conni
- Contraptus
- Cooking for Kids with Luis
- Contraptus
- Curious George
- Daffy Duck Show
- Danny and Daddy Duets
- Diego in prijatelji
- Di-Gata Defenders
- Dora the Explorer
- Dr Otter
- Dragon Hunters
- DreamWorks Dragons
- Duck Dodgers
- Ed and Eppa
- Eon Kid
- Eureka TV
- Ever After High
- Family Dog
- Fifi and the Flowertots
- Finley the Fire Engine
- Firehouse Tales
- Fish 'n' Chips
- Florrie's Dragons
- Frances
- Frog & Friends
- Fun with Flupe
- Get Ed
- Go, Diego, Go!
- Grimm's Fairy Tale Classics
- Grizzy & the Lemmings
- Gormiti
- Grabouillon
- Grossology
- Grossery Gang
- Guess with Jess
- Harold and the Purple Crayon
- Hello Kitty's Paradise
- Heidi
- Henry's World
- Hikarian
- Horrid Henry
- Horseland
- Identity Kids
- It's a Big Big World
- Jackie Chan Adventures
- Jetlag Productions Movies
- Katie and Orbie
- Kim Possible
- The Koala Brothers
- Lalaloopsy
- Lazy Lucy
- LazyTown
- The Land Before Time
- Legend of Enyo
- Legion of Super Heroes
- Lego City
- Lego Elves
- Lego Friends
- Lego Legends of Chima
- Lego Nexo Knights
- Lego Ninjago: Masters of Spinjitzu
- Lego Star Wars: The Empire Strikes Out
- Lego Star Wars: The Padawan Menace
- Little Einsteins
- Little People
- Little Red Tractor
- Littlest Pet Shop
- Lunar Jim
- Madeline
- Mademoiselle Zazie
- Malo Korrigan and the Space Tracer
- Le Manège enchanté
- Mary-Kate and Ashley in Action!
- Masha and the Bear
- Masha's Spooky Stories
- Max Steel
- Meeow!
- Mia
- Mia and Me
- Mickey Mouse Clubhouse
- Miffy and Friends
- Minuscule
- Miraculous: Tales of Ladybug & Cat Noir
- Monster High
- Monsuno
- Muffin the Mule
- Mumu Hug
- My Friends Tigger and Pooh
- My Little Pony: Friendship Is Magic
- Nan and Lili
- Nickelodeon Sunday Movie Toons
- Num Noms webisodes
- Nutri Ventures
- Nutsberry Town
- The Octonauts
- Oddbods
- Oggy and the Cockroaches
- Oscar the Balloonist
- Out of Jimmy's Head
- Paw Patrol
- Pearlie
- Peep and the Big Wide World
- Pelswick
- Pet Squad
- The Penguins of Madagascar
- Philipp
- Phineas and Ferb
- Phoenix Animation Studios Movies
- Pixi and the Magic Wall
- Peter Pan
- The Podcats
- Poko
- PopPixie
- Postman Pat
- Preston Pig
- Professor Balthazar
- Regal Academy
- Roary the Racing Car
- Rolie Polie Olie
- Power Rangers
- Pucca
- Puppy in My Pocket
- Le Ranch
- Rubbadubbers
- Rupert Bear, Follow the Magic...
- Sabrina
- Sabrina's Secret Life
- Slugterra
- Scruff
- SheZow
- Shopkins
- Sit Down, Shut Up
- Sitting Ducks
- The Smurfs
- SpongeBob SquarePants
- Stanley
- Star Wars: Clone Wars
- Strawberry Shortcake
- Strawberry Shortcake's Berry Bitty Adventures
- Stuart Little
- Super GALS!
- Tashi
- Squirrel Boy
- The Sylvester & Tweety Mysteries
- Teenage Mutant Ninja Turtles (2003)
- Teenage Mutant Ninja Turtles (2012)
- The New Teletubbies
- The Tidings
- Thumbelina: A Magical Story
- Tiny Planets
- Tom and Jerry
- Transformers: Animated
- Transformers Cybertron
- Transformers: Robots in Disguise
- Transformers: Prime
- Trash Pack
- Tricky TV
- Tobias Totz und sein Löwe
- Turbo Fast
- U-Hugs
- Ultimate Book of Spells
- Veggie Tales
- Vicky & Johnny
- Vic the Viking
- Watership Down
- Wendy
- What's New, Scooby-Doo?
- Wild Kratts
- Willow Town
- Winx Club
- W.I.T.C.H.
- The Wonderful Wizard of Oz
- Yo-kai Watch
- YooHoo & Friends
- Yu-Gi-Oh!
- Yu-Gi-Oh! GX
- Zeke's Pad
- Zenki
- Zigby

== DVB-T ==
Since 1 December 2010, POP TV programming has been available in the digital (DVB-T) technique. Transmission is, since 14 October 2013, a part of the national digital multiplex called multiplex C. Since 16 January 2017, POP TV has no longer been available via DVB-T.

== See also ==
- Pro Plus d.o.o.
- Kanal A
- BRIO
