= 2010 Slovenian public broadcaster law referendum =

12 December 2010
- Are you in favor of the Law on Radiotelevision Slovenia (ZRTVS-2), EPA 1067-V, adopted by the National Assembly at its session on 20 October 2010?

Results
Choice	Votes	%
Yes	69,175	27.67%
No	180,820	72.33%
Valid votes	249,995	99.07%
Invalid or blank votes	2,348	0.93%
Total votes	252,343	100.00%
Registered voters/turnout	1,707,209	14.78%

A referendum was held in Slovenia on 12 December 2010 on a new public broadcaster law.

== Issues ==
The reform was an attempt to reverse the reform of 2005 proposed by the conservative Prime Minister Janez Janša, which was widely seen as an attempt to move the public broadcaster Radiotelevizija Slovenija to the right of the political spectrum. The RTVS referendum held that year narrowly approved the reform; polls indicated that the 2010 referendum would also see a close result at the low turnout, with only 55.3% of voters interested in the referendum (28.4% to 26.9% in favour of the reform).

== Results ==
The referendum failed clearly, but at a very low turnout, which was interpreted as the Slovenian voters being fed up with the large amount of referendums being held.

Choice	Votes	%
For	69,175	27.67
Against	180,820	72.33
Total	249,995	100.00
Valid votes	249,995	99.07
Invalid/blank votes	2,348	0.93
Total votes	252,343	100.00
Registered voters/turnout	1,707,209	14.78
Source: Državna Volina Komisija
