= Pro Plus =

Pro Plus may refer to:

- Pro Plus (company), a media company in Slovenia
- Professional Plus, an edition of Microsoft Office software suite
- Pro Plus, a brand of caffeine pill
