= Vzemi ali pusti =

Television series

- Genre: Game show
- Country of origin: Slovenia
- Original language: Slovenian

Original release
- Network: POP TV

Related
- Deal or No Deal franchise

Vzemi ali pusti ("Take It or Leave It") is the Slovenian version of Deal or No Deal, which is produced by POP TV. The show originally had a top prize of 15,000,000 tolarjev (about US$82,000), but it has changed to €70,000 (about US$97,000) since Slovenia's switch to the euro on New Year's Day, 2007.

== Box Values (new) ==
€0.01
€0.10
€0.50
€1
€2
€2.50
€5
€10
€15
€20
€25
€50

€100
€200
€300
€400
€500
€1,000
€2,500
€5,000
€10,000
€15,000
€35,000
€70,000

== Box Values (old) ==
1
5
10
50
100
500
1,000
2,500
5,000
10,000
25,000
50,000

100,000
200,000
300,000
500,000
750,000
1,000,000
2,000,000
3,000,000
4,000,000
5,000,000
10,000,000
15,000,000
