= MasterChef Slovenia =

- Genre: Cookery
- Judges: Luka Jezeršek; Bine Volčič; Karim Merdjadi; Mojmir Šiftar; Alma Rekić
- Narrated by: Sašo Prešeren
- Country of origin: Slovenia
- Original language: Slovenian
- No. of seasons: 10

Original release
- Network: POP TV (Slovenia only)
- Release: 2015 – present

MasterChef Slovenia (MasterChef Slovenija) is a Slovenian competitive reality television cooking show based on the original British version of MasterChef. It premiered in 2015.

== Summary ==
After elimination auditions of 50 amateur cooks only 16 will compete in the MasterChef kitchen. Their dishes will be judged by three judges. Through the series the cooks who won't complete the expectations will be eliminated. On the end the winner will get the MasterChef Slovenia title and 50,000 euros.

The applications for the show were at first open until 15 February, later extended until 26 February. The production of season 1 is set to take place from March to the end of April 2015.

== Production ==
The applications for the show were initially open until 15 February, later extended until 28 February. The production of season 1 is set to take place from March to the end of April 2015.
