= Brio (TV channel) =

Slovenian TV channel

BRIO
- Country: Slovenia

Programming
- Picture format: 16:9 (576i, SDTV)

Ownership
- Owner: Pro Plus d.o.o. (CME)
- Sister channels: POP TV, Kanal A, OTO, KINO

History
- Launched: 3 September 2010

Links
- Website: spored.24ur.com

Brio is a Slovenian reality television channel targeting female viewers. It was launched by Pro Plus as Pop Brio in September 2010 and replaced the former TV Pika.

Pop Brio was one of six channels of the first Slovenian subscription package, Pop Non Stop, which launched in September 2011. In 2013, the package was discontinued along with the three of the channels; the remaining three channels, including Pop Brio, became free to view.

In 2014, Pop Brio became known as Brio.

== Program ==
=== International series ===
| Original title | Country |
|---|---|
| The Office (TV series) | USA |
| Spin City (TV series) | USA |
| Love Island | USA |
| Law & Order: Special Victims Unit | USA |
| The Mentalist | USA |
| Criminal Minds | USA |
| Two And a Half men | USA |
| Superstore | USA |
| Good Girls | USA |
| Friends | USA |

Nationally created Series / Shows

| Original title | Country |
|---|---|
| Naša mala klinika | Slovenia |
| Lepo je biti sosed | Slovenia |
| TV dober dan | Slovenia |
| Na terapiji (premiere) | Slovenia |
| Supermodel Slovenija (premiere) | Slovenia |

== See also ==
- Pro Plus d.o.o.
- POP TV
- Kanal A
