= 40 Green Elephants =

- Genre: Children's
- Created by: Franček Rudolf
- Directed by: Zoran Lesić; Jurij Souček
- Voices of: Jurij Souček
- Composer: Črt Škodlar
- Country of origin: Slovenia
- Original language: Slovene
- No. of seasons: 1
- No. of episodes: 7

Production
- Production company: RTV Ljubljana

Original release
- Network: RTV Ljubljana
- Release: 1981

40 Green Elephants (Slovene: 40 zelenih slonov) is a Slovenian animation children's television series about 40 green elephants. Cartoon was created by Slovenian screenwriter Franček Rudolf. Original run and production company was at the same time produced by RTV Ljubljana.

== Episodes ==
No.	Title	Directed by	Written by
1	"40 Green Elephants"	Zoran Lesić, Jurij Souček	Franček Rudolf
2	"Giants"	Zoran Lesić, Jurij Souček	Franček Rudolf
3	"Giant's Canaries"	Zoran Lesić, Jurij Souček	Franček Rudolf
4	"Flying Rabbits"	Zoran Lesić, Jurij Souček	Franček Rudolf
5	"Garden Of Green Dragons, The"	Zoran Lesić, Jurij Souček	Franček Rudolf
6	"Elephants Can Be Pears"	Zoran Lesić, Jurij Souček	Franček Rudolf
7	"Elephants Return"	Zoran Lesić, Jurij Souček	Franček Rudolf
