= 24UR =

Slovenian daily news show on POP TV

24UR (24 hours) is a daily news show on the Slovenian commercial television POP TV, which airs every day at 7 PM. During workdays, the show also has an afternoon edition - 24UR POPOLDNE (at 5 PM) - and an evening edition - 24UR ZVEČER (at around 10 PM).

== Awards and nominations ==
- Professional viktor for the best news TV show (years 2004, 2005, 2006, 2007, 2008)
- Nomination for a professional viktor for the best news TV show (years 1997, 1998, 1999, 2000, 2001, 2002, 2003, 2009, 2010, 2011)
- Popularity viktor for the best TV show (2012)
