= TV dober dan =

Slovenian television series

TV dober dan is a Slovenian television sitcom that aired on POP TV. Filming began in August 1999, the series debuted in October 1999 and concluded in May 2002, after more than 80 episodes.

== Cast ==
- Ana Ban (Tjaša Železnik)
- Samo Kral (Primož Ekart)
- Miran Podrepnik (Kondi Pižorn)
- Frane Merkatori (Jernej Kuntner)
- Zofka Mlakar (Barica Blenkuš)
- Jože (Janez Cankar)
- Mr. Johnny Smith (Damjan Perne)
- Izidor (Matjaž Javšnik)
- Luka Jazbec (Vito Rožej)
- Ingrid Babnik (Alenka Kozolc)
- Fata (Lucija Ćirović)
- Valentin Zois (Peter Musevski)
- Amanda (Iva Babić)
