= Jonas Žnidaršič =

Slovenian television personality and journalist (born 1962)

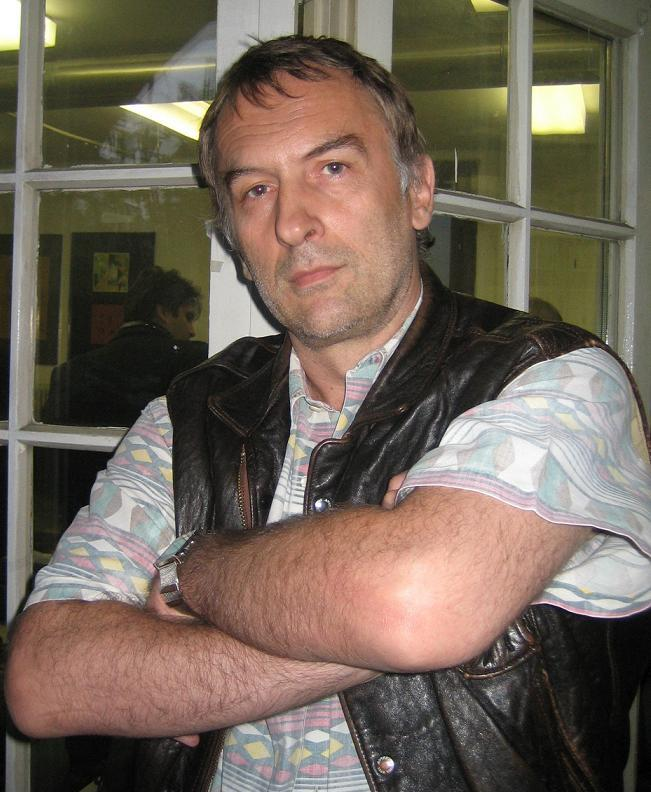
- Born: January 30, 1962 (age 64); Novo Mesto, FPR Yugoslavia
- Occupations: Journalist, TV personality

Jonas Žnidaršič (born 30 January 1962 in Novo Mesto) is a Slovenian television personality and journalist. He is best known for hosting the Slovenian version of Who Wants to Be a Millionaire?. He has appeared on Late Night Poker in Great Britain. From May 2022 to April 2026, he served as a member of the Slovenian National Assembly.
