= Lepo je biti sosed =

Slovenian television series

Lepo je biti sosed (It's nice to be neighbours) is a Slovenian television series, which started filming in 2008 and after six seasons, ended May 2011. The broadcast television series called POP TV in the Monday evening slot (20.00), its director was Jemeršič Ven. The first three seasons are copied from the original Slovak. The plot tells about two neighbouring families with good relationships.

The storyline is about two couples, who live across the hallway to each other. The first couple are Žuža (formally Branka), the seller of high-quality products and Beno, the hunter. They have a daughter; Lidija, but she doesn't appear during season 1 nor is she mentioned. The second couple are Silvika, immigrant from Hungary and Ivo, who is a handyman. They moved into their apartment during the pilot episode, however they knew Beno and Žuža prior to moving in.

During series many recurring characters appeared. The first season recurring characters Vanessa Z and mailman were portrayed by popular singers Anika Horvat and Fredi Miler.

The first-season episodes are 40 minutes long (30 minutes without commercials), however episodes in the following season were 60 minutes long (45 minutes without commercials). Episodes were shown on a Monday at 20:00 CET.

== Cast ==
Actor	Role	Season appeared in
Vesna Pernarčič Žunić	Silvija Špeh-Silvika	1.-6. sezona
Alojz Svete	Ivan Špeh-Ivo	1.-6. season
Mario Dragojevič	Tibor Špeh	2.-3. season, las episode of 4th season-6. season
Maša Židanik Bjelobrk	Branka Sagadin-Žuža	1.-6. season
Gorazd Žilavec	Benjamin Sagadin-Beno	1.-6. season
Anže Sagadin	2.-3. season, las episode of 4th season	
Anika Horvat	Vanessa Z.	1. season -2. episode 2. season
Veronika Žajdela	Pamela	2. del 2. sezone-3. sezona
Ana Dolinar	Anamarija	4. del 4. sezone-6. sezona
Maja Martina Merljak	Sabrina	5.-6. seasone
Fredi Miler	poštar	1.-3. sezona, 5.-6. sezona
Vojko Belšak	Smiljan Bodiroža	6. del 3. sezone-6. sezona
Vladimir Vlaškalič	Renato Bezeg	4.-6. sezona

== List of seasons ==
Season	Episode	Original airdate	
Season	Episode	Season premiere	End of season
1	15	13. October 2008	19. January 2009
2	17	23. February 2009	15. June 2009
3	15	14. September 2009	21. December 2009
4	17	15. February 2010	17. Maj 2010
5	14	6. September 2010	6. December 2010
6	20	17. January 2011	20. Maj 2011

== List of episodes ==
=== Sezona 1 ===
Zap. #	Epizoda sezone	Naslov epizode	Premierno predvajanje
1.	1.	Selitev	13. oktober 2008
2.	2.	V sedmih nebesih	20. oktober 2008
3.	3.	Dvojčici	27. oktober 2008
4.	4.	Tašča	3. November 2008
5.	5.	Pica	10. November 2008
6.	6.	Vikend	17. November 2008
7.	7.	Obletnica poroke	24. November 2008
8.	8.	Veliki televisor	1. December 2008
9.	9.	Miklavž	8. December 2008
10.	10.	Darila	15. December 2008
11.	11.	Božič	22. December
12.	12.	Silvester	29. December 2008
13.	13.	Gretica	5. januar 2009
14.	14.	Koča	12. januar
15.	15.	Rojstni dan	19. januar 2009

=== Sezona 2 ===
Zap. #	Epizoda sezone	Naslov epizode	Premierno predvajanje
16.	1.	Tajnica	23. februar 2009
17.	2.	Tibor	2. marec 2009
18.	3.	Obisk iz Pariza	9. marec 2009
19.	4.	Zamenjava žena 1. del	16. marec 2009
20.	5.	Zamenjava žena 2. del	23. marec 2009
21.	6.	Super novica	30. marec 2009
22.	7.	Pomemben obisk	6. April 2009
23.	8.	Velika noč	13. April 2009
24.	9.	Postelja	20. April 2009
25.	10.	Prstan	27. April 2009
26.	11.	Ločitev 1. del	4. maj 2009
27.	12.	Ločitev 2. del	11. maj 2009
28.	13.	Ljubosumni možje	18. maj 2009
29.	14.	Ščurki	25. maj 2009
30.	15.	Silvikin rojstni dan	1. junij 2009
31.	16.	Alarm	8. junij 2009
32.	17.	Reisefiber	15. junij 2009

=== Sezona 3 ===
Zap. #	Epizoda sezone	Naslov epizode	Premierno predvajanje
33.	1.	Vrnitev z dopusta	14. September 2009
34.	2.	Dokaz ljubezni	21. September 2008
35.	3.	Tetovaža	28. September 2009
36.	4.	Fotomodel	5. oktober 2009
37.	5.	Maček-Hrček-Miš	12. oktober 2009
38.	6.	Piknik	19. oktober 2009
39.	7.	Stava	26. oktober 2009
40.	8.	Nagrobni venci	2. November 2009
41.	9.	Noč čarovnic	9. November 2009
42.	10.	Disco party	16. November 2009
43.	11.	Totalka	23. November 2009
44.	12.	Vozniški izpit	30. November 2009
45.	13.	Piramida	7. December 2009
46.	14.	Otroško miklavževanje	14. December 2009
47.	15.	Guru	21. December 2009

=== Sezona 4 ===
Zap. #	Epizoda sezone	Naslov epizode	Premierno predvajanje
48.	1.	Hišnik	15. februar 2010
49.	2.	Nosečnost	22. februar 2010
50.	3.	Loto	1. marec 2010
51.	4.	Poročna torta	8. marec 2010
52.	5.	Spidi	15. marec 2010
53.	6.	Impotenca	22. marec 2010
54.	7.	Treba je samo verjeti	29 .marec 2010
55.	8.	Zaljubljeni poštar	5. April 2010
56.	9.	Zaroka	12. April 2010
57.	10.	Vedeževalec	19. April 2010
58.	11.	Kasting agencija	26. April 2010
59.	12.	Ponarejevalci denarja	3. maj 2010
60.	13.	Pasulj	10. maj 2010
61.	14.	Inštruktorica aerobike	17. maj 2010
62.	15.	Eko Ivo	24. maj 2010
63.	16.	Totalna zmešnjava	31. maj 2010
64.	17.	Poslednji Patriot	7. junij 2010

=== Sezona 5 ===
Zap. #	Epizoda sezone	Naslov epizode	Premierno predvajanje
65.	1.	Rock'n'roll	September 2010
66.	2.	Študentka	13. September 2010
67.	3.	Ivotov brat	20. September 2010
68.	4.	Miss soseske	27. September 2010
69.	5.	Facebook	4. oktober 2010
70.	6.	Izguba spomina	11. oktober 2010
71.	7.	Spanish Trek Was	18. oktober 2010
72.	8.	Vernika	25. oktober 2010
73.	9.	Dalmacija	1. November 2010
74.	10.	Predcednik krajevne skupnosi	8. November 2010
75.	11.	Bioenergija	15. November 2010
76.	12.	Davčna	22. November 2010
77.	13.	Oporoka	29. November 2010
78.	14.	Najbolša patrija	6. December 2010

=== Sezona 6 ===
Zap. #	Epizoda sezone	Naslov epizode	Premierno predvajanje
79.	1.	Snežna vojna	17. januar 2011
80.	2.	Koline	24. januar 2011
81.	3.	Človek, ne jezi se!	31. januar 2011
82.	4.	Najljubša učiteljica	7. februar 2011
83.	5.	Nezakonski sin	14. februar 2011
84.	6.	Poslednji planšar	21. februar 2011
85.	7.	Fuzbal	28. februar 2011
86.	8.	Sesalec	7. marec 2011
87.	9.	Družinsko deblo	14. marec 2011
88.	10.	Civilna zaščita	21. marec 2011
89.	11.	Antistres	28. marec 2011
90.	12.	Dan hvaležnosti	4. April 2011
91.	13.	Kroglica	11. April 2011
92.	14.	Polžje dirke	18. April 2011
93.	15.	Domača obrt	25. April 2011
94.	16.	Hipi Ivo	2. maj 2011
95.	17.	Gripa in oslovski kašelj	9. maj 2011
96.	18.	Stevardesa na balonu	16. maj 2011
97.	19.	Cvetličarna, trafika, top shop, handy čistilnica	23. maj 2011
98.	20.	Požar	30. maj 2011

The plot tells about two neighbouring families with good relationships.
