= Peter Poles =

Slovenian television personality

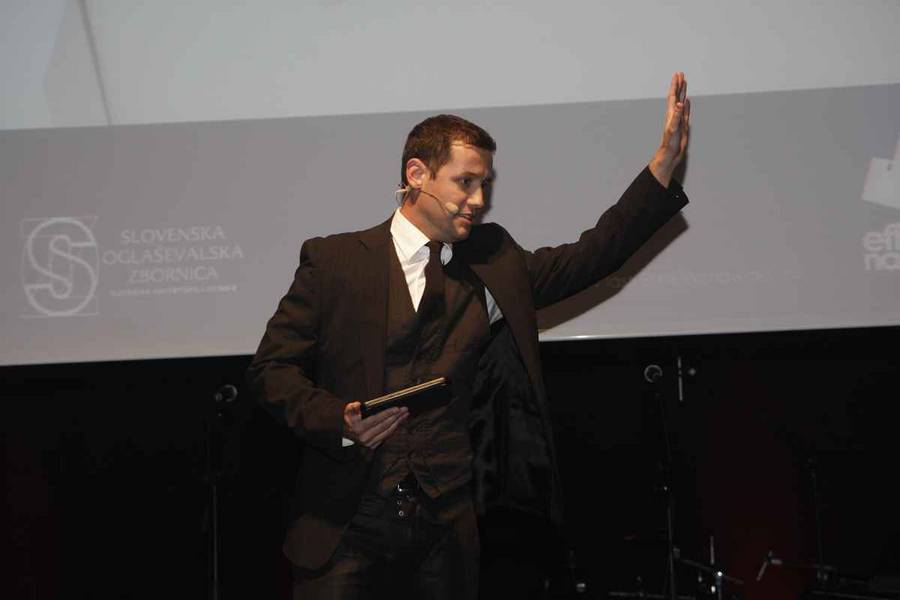
- Peter Poles in 2011
- Born: 6 February 1978 (age 48); Slovenj Gradec, SR Slovenia, SFR Yugoslavia
- Years active: 2000 - present
- Known for: 2010 Slovenija ima Talent (host)

Peter Poles (born February 6, 1978, in Slovenj Gradec) is a Slovenian television personality, responsible for presenting the Slovenian televote results in various editions of the Eurovision Song Contest. Poles first filled this role in 2003, returning in all years until 2009 (except 2005, when the spokesperson was Katarina Čas). In 2010, 2011, 2013, 2014 and 2015 he was one of two hosts in the Slovenian version of show Got talent (Slovenija ima Talent / Slovenia's got talent) the show was broadcast by Slovenian commercial television channel POP TV. In 2015 he got his own TV show similar to once popular German Rudi Carrel Show - Dan najlepših sanj (The Day of most beautiful dreams).

Poles has added comedy whilst giving his results:

- in 2003, as Slovenia was the final country to vote with the overall winner still unknown, Poles joked by disappearing from camera view for a few seconds;
- in 2004 he gave Slovene 12 points to Slovenia, while these points Slovenian viewers gave to Serbia and Montenegro;
- in 2006 he asked the female host of the contest, Maria Menounos to marry him by wearing a t-shirt with the message "Maria Marry Me";
- in 2007, he imitated Alenka Gotar, then a Slovenian representative at the Eurovision Song Contest by projecting a large flashlight to his face (Alenka had a special flash device on her palm while performing her song, projecting light on her face);
- in 2008 he greeted hosts (Serbia) in their native language, commented about former Yugoslavian brotherhood and continued in completely informal friendly style.
- in 2009 he declared that instead of jokes, he would hold a minute of silence as Slovenia had failed to make the final two years in a row. After approximately 14 seconds of silence, and following a prompter from Russian presenter Alsou, he proceeded to announce Slovenia's votes.
