= TV Celje =

Regional television station in Slovenia

TV Celje is a regional television station in Slovenia, based in Celje.
