= TV SLO 2 =

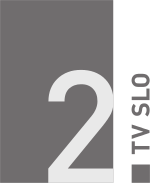
- Country: Slovenia
- Headquarters: Ljubljana

Programming
- Picture format: 1080i (16:9) (HDTV)

Ownership
- Owner: Radiotelevizija Slovenija (RTVSLO)
- Sister channels: TV SLO 1; TV SLO 3; TV Koper-Capodistria; TV Maribor

History
- Launched: 1 June 1970; 55 years ago
- Former names: TV Ljubljana 2 (1970–1991)

Links
- Website: www.rtvslo.si/tv/vzivo/tvs2

Availability

Terrestrial
- Digital: Channel 2

TV SLO 2, or TV Slovenija 2 is a Slovenian free-to-air television channel owned and operated by Radiotelevizija Slovenija (RTVSLO). It is the organization's second television channel, and is known for specialized programming, aiming at limited audiences, as well as airing television series and sporting events.

== History ==
Initially, TV Ljubljana 2 was part of a joint network with RTV Belgrade and RTV Zagreb. In 1979, it became an independent channel.

HD broadcasts began on 1 June 2012, following the closure of TV SLO HD.

Between 2015 and 2019, its viewing share rose from 0.2% to 2.9%. With the lockdown in March 2020, TV SLO 2 started airing a program produced by Radio Val 202, featuring performances from Slovenian musicians. On 20 February 2023, Rajko Gerič was appointed its editor-in-chief, for a period of four years.

The channel stopped airing infomercials for natural supplements disguised as talk shows in early 2025, alongside Radio Val 202. The move came after one of the companies involved, Biostile, was investigated.

== Logos and identities ==
1992 to 1996

1996 to 2000

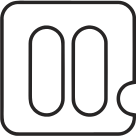
2000 to 2007

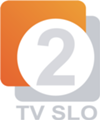
2007 to 2012/2013

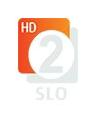
2007 to 2012/2013 (HD variation)

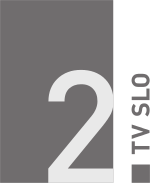
Since 2012/2013
