= 2005 Slovenian RTVS referendum =

| 25 September 2005 |
- Are you in favor of the implementation of the Law on Radiotelevizija Slovenija (ZRTVS-1), which was adopted by the National Assembly of the Republic of Slovenia on 15 July 2005, at the proposal of the Government of the Republic of Slovenia?

Results
| Choice | Votes | % |
|---|---|---|
| Yes | 253,931 | 50.70% |
| No | 246,960 | 49.30% |
| Valid votes | 500,891 | 99.22% |
| Invalid or blank votes | 3,960 | 0.78% |
| Total votes | 504,851 | 100.00% |
| Registered voters/turnout | 1,644,270 | 30.7% |

A referendum on political control of Radiotelevizija Slovenija was held in Slovenia on 25 September 2005. Voters were asked whether they approved of increasing political control of the country's public broadcaster. The proposal was approved by 50.7% of voters, although voter turnout was only 30.7%.

== Results ==
| Choice | Votes | % |
|---|---|---|
| For | 253,931 | 50.7 |
| Against | 246,960 | 49.3 |
| Invalid/blank votes | 3,960 | – |
| Total | 504,851 | 100 |
| Registered voters/turnout | 1,644,270 | 30.7 |
Source: Nohlen & Stöver
