= TV SLO 3 =

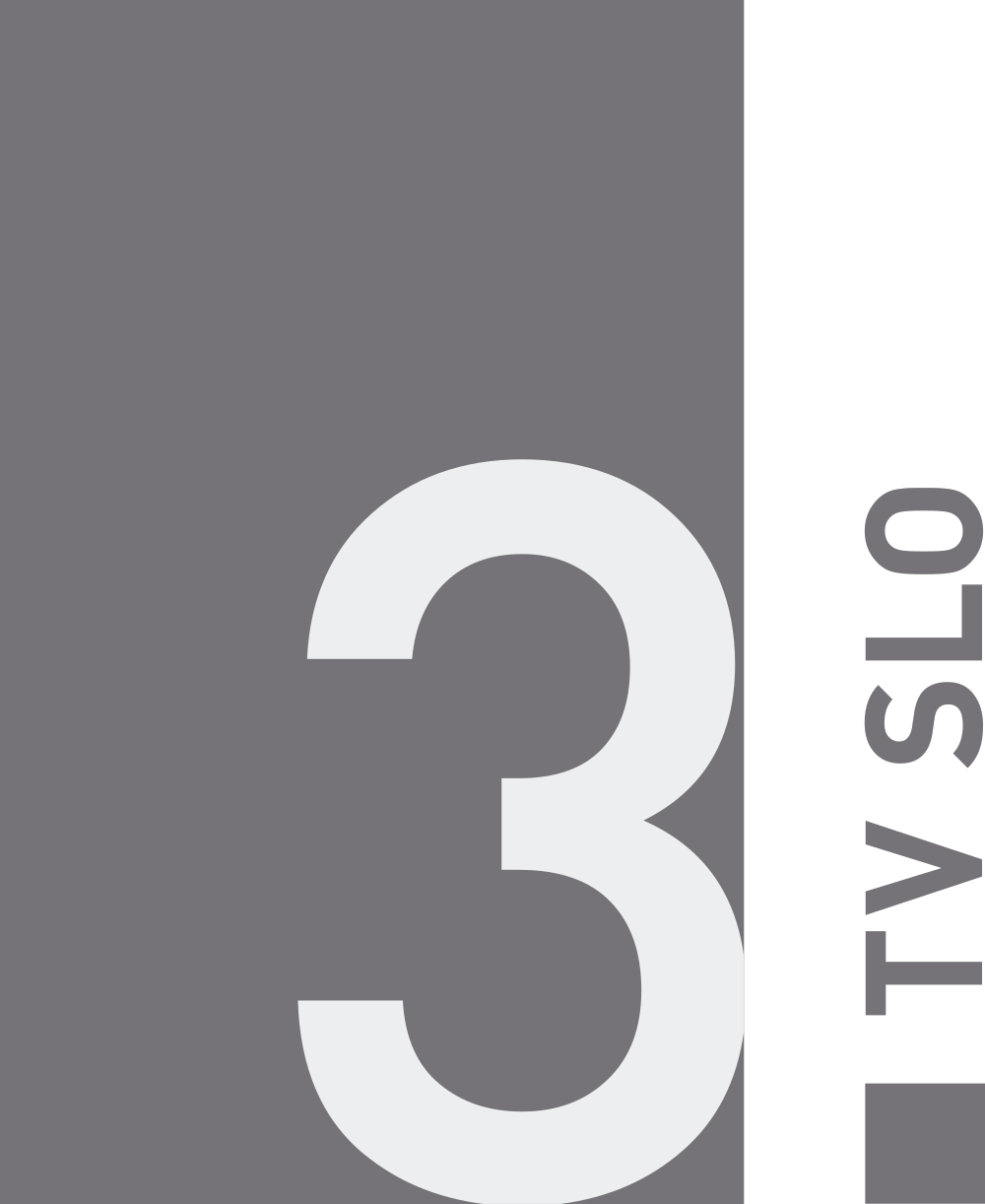
- Country: Slovenia
- Headquarters: Ljubljana

Programming
- Picture format: 1080i (16:9) (HDTV)

Ownership
- Owner: Radiotelevizija Slovenija (RTVSLO)
- Sister channels: TV SLO 1; TV SLO 2; TV Koper-Capodistria; TV Maribor

History
- Launched: 21 June 2008; 17 years ago

Links
- Website: www.rtvslo.si/tv/vzivo/tvs3

Availability

Terrestrial
- Digital: Channel 3

TV SLO 3, or TV Slovenija 3 is a Slovenian free-to-air television channel owned and operated by Radiotelevizija Slovenija (RTVSLO). The channel mainly broadcasts parliamentary and current affairs-related programming.

== History ==
The creation of a third national RTV SLO channel was first envisioned in 2005, with the passing of the Slovenian Radiotelevision Law (or Grimsov Law), in which the broadcaster would open a channel dedicated to sessions of the National Assembly of Slovenia and its related organs.

Test broadcasts started on 21 May 2008, becoming regular on 16 June 2008 with a special ceremony.

The channel's main role is that of public supervision, with the aim of increasing awareness of the functions of the Assembly. In addition to its parliamentary programming, TV SLO 3 carries repeats of news and other programs from the regional centers, as well as documentaries and its own news bulletins, including sign language editions.

SD broadcasts ceased on 17 January 2022 on terrestrial television, leaving only the HD feed operational.
