= TV Koper-Capodistria =

Slovenian television channel

TV Koper - Capodistria
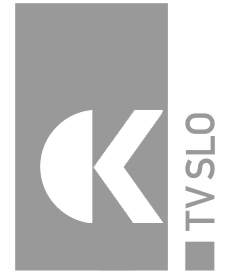
- Country: Slovenia

Programming
- Picture format: 1080i HDTV

Ownership
- Owner: Radiotelevizija Slovenija
- Sister channels: TV SLO 1; TV SLO 2; TV SLO 3; TV Maribor

History
- Launched: 6 May 1971; 54 years ago

Links
- Website: TV Koper/Capodistria

Availability

Terrestrial
- Digital terrestrial television: Varies on location

Streaming media
- rtvslo.si: TV Koper/Capodistria live

TV Koper Capodistria is a Slovene free-to-air television channel based in Koper, Slovenia. Mainly funded by state aid, the channel serves the Italian-speaking minority in Slovenia and Croatia. It can also be received in the Italian region of Friuli-Venezia Giulia.

== History ==
On 6 May 1971, TV Koper-Capodistria began its operations, when, at the time, there were no private channels in Italy. Two days later on 8 May, the first news bulletin aired, an Italian news service catering the Italian minority in northwestern Yugoslavia, broadcasting in color (six years in advance compared to RAI): Capodistria became the first television station in an adjacent area to Italy to broadcast in color and rapidly expanded across most of the Italian territory. It aired the 1972 Summer Olympics, the 1974 FIFA World Cup, UEFA Euro 1976 and the 1976 Summer Olympics.

== Popular shows ==
The channel covers international, regional, and local news from both sides of the border. The editorial section for culture programmes shows Artevisione, Istria e... dintorni, L’Universo e`... and Itinerari. The shows, with documentaries, reports, and magazine formats, focus on the regional and local cultural life in Slovenia, Italy, and Croatia.

The channel is notable by the first music video TV show, not only in the former Titoist Yugoslavia, but also in the neighboring Italy, featuring popular Western music videos during the 1980s with its host Dario Diviacchi enjoining a star status among his young TV audience. The show, first under the name "Alta Pressione" ("High Pressure") and later "Video Mix", was on air every Thursday evening. A phone-in format with the TV viewers choosing among the music videos to be aired on the show, was introduced later with host Alex Bini.

The music program made the channel popular in Italy, where the show was the third most viewed TV show in 1985.

== Logo history ==
Between late 70's and 1987 (On-screen logo)

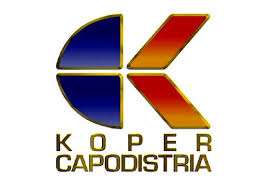
1987-2007

2007-2012

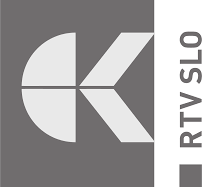
Since 2012

== See also ==
- Istrian Italians
- RTV Slovenija
- Italian language in Slovenia
- Italian language in Croatia
- Slovenian Littoral
- Istria
