= TV Maribor =

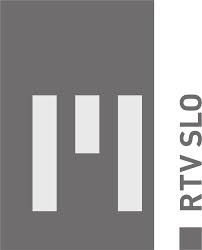
- Country: Slovenia
- Headquarters: Maribor

Programming
- Picture format: 1080i (16:9) (HDTV)

Ownership
- Owner: RTV SLO
- Sister channels: TV SLO 1; TV SLO 2; TV SLO 3; TV Koper-Capodistria

History
- Launched: 23 September 2002; 23 years ago
- Former names: Tele M (2002–2007)

Links
- Website: www.rtvslo.si/tv/vzivo/tvmb

TV Maribor is a regional television channel owned by RTV SLO, catering to the city of Maribor. The channel is available nationwide on digital terrestrial television.

== History ==
Television programs from the Maribor center began in 1968, but it wasn't until 2002 that the Maribor channel became independent in its own right. The channel started broadcasting on 23 September 2002; at launch, it produced no less than fourteen programs.

During the third group round of the 2018 FIFA World Cup, the channel aired some of the matches that could not air on TV SLO 1 due to the fact that the matches happened at the same time. TV SLO 3, which started HD broadcasts in June 2018, was initially selected for that role, but the plan was rejected due to its status as a public interest (mostly legislative) channel. The channel did not broadcast in HD at the time, meaning that eight of the 64 matches were aired exclusively in SD.
