= TV SLO 1 =

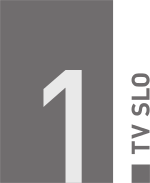
- Country: Slovenia
- Headquarters: Ljubljana

Programming
- Picture format: 1080i (16:9) (HDTV)

Ownership
- Owner: Radiotelevizija Slovenija (RTVSLO)
- Sister channels: TV SLO 2; TV SLO 3; TV Koper-Capodistria; TV Maribor

History
- Launched: 11 October 1958; 67 years ago
- Former names: Televizija Ljubljana (1958–1970); TV Ljubljana 1 (1970–1991)

Links
- Website: www.rtvslo.si/tv/vzivo/tvs1

Availability

Terrestrial
- Digital: Channel 1

TV SLO 1 or TV Slovenija 1 is a Slovenian free-to-air television channel owned and operated by Radiotelevizija Slovenija (RTVSLO). It is the organization's flagship television channel and is known for broadcasting mainstream and generalist programming, which features news, feature films, documentaries, talk shows, drama series, children's programs, entertainment programs, and live events.

== History ==
On 11 October 1958, Televizija Ljubljana began broadcasting, as the third television station in Yugoslavia, after the stations in Belgrade and Zagreb. The following month, the three operative television stations in Yugoslavia formed Radio and Television Yugoslavia, with Ljubljana having 30% of the airtime, shared with Zagreb (30%) and Belgrade (40%). In 1963, Yugoslavia was federalized, but there were concerns that the Communist Party was indirectly influencing television programs. Censorship at the Ljubljana station remained limited in the 1960s, operating mainly as an independent branch.

On 22 November 1958, the first television play was broadcast; and on 21 January 1959, the first transmission from the Ljubljana Opera. RTV Ljubljana started producing content for the Eurovision network in 1960, with carriage of ski jumps from Planica.

In its first decade, RTV Ljubljana aimed at building a transmitter network for all of Slovenia; by the mid-1960s, access to television sets increased thanks to rapid urbanization, while broadcasting a significant amount of productions from the western world. Viewers had access to ORF and RAI signals by overspill, but RAI broadcasts were opposed by RTB's leadership, who thought that a regional program in Slovene produced by the Italian broadcaster approached viewers to NATO politics and Western values; said program continued production despite political pressure.

In 1961, there were demands for TV Ljubljana to air a dubbed version of Dnevnik, which at the time was a common program produced in Belgrade. Beginning 15 April 1968, RTV Ljubljana began producing its local Dnevnik for the first time, with the aim of cementing the Slovenian identity and language.

Beginning in the early 1970s (work started in 1971), the station started using the Krim transmitting station. Color television was progressively rolled out during the 1970s, with the first color presenters appearing in 1972, followed by the move to the new color-ready facilities in 1975, and, from 1 January 1978, it was the turn of Dnevnik to begin broadcasting in color.

In January 2025, TV SLO 1 will cut the broadcast of controversial teleshopping-related advertising, including advertising for food supplements, by approximately 70%. The move came after the abolition of such advertisements from Radio Val 202 and TV SLO 2, which received complaints from viewers.

After boycotting its participation in the 2026 Eurovision Song Contest, TV SLO 1 covered the week of the contest with Glasovi Palestine (Voices of Palestine), which includes a special edition of Dosje about the status of status of Israel in the contest.

== International availability ==
The channel is available throughout Europe, northern Africa and parts of the Middle East through the Eutelsat 16A satellite, where it moved from the former Hotbird 13D on 1 September 2013. In Austria, it's available on Magenta's TV service as a local channel in Klagenfurt. A1 Croatia also includes it in its channel offer.

== Logos and identities ==
1992 to 1996

1996 to 2000

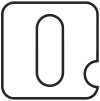
2000 to 2007

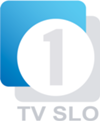
2007 to 2012/2013

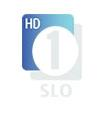
2007 to 2012/2013 (HD variation)

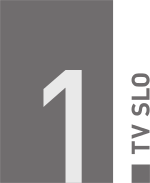
Since 2012/2013
