= Radiotelevizija Slovenija =

Public broadcaster of Slovenia

Coordinates: 46°03′15″N 14°30′31.70″E

- The RTV Slovenija building was designed by Franc Rihtar and built in 1975.
- Type: Broadcast radio, television and online
- Country: Slovenia
- Headquarters: Kolodvorska ulica 2, 1000 Ljubljana
- Owner: Government of Slovenia
- Key people: Zvezdan Martić (President of the Management Board); Andrej Trček (Member of the Management Board); Franci Pavšer (Worker Director of RTV Slovenija)
- Launch date: 1928 (radio); 1958 (television); 2002 (multimedia portal)
- Former names: Radio-Televizija Ljubljana (until 1990)
- Former affiliations: Yugoslav Radio Television (JRT)
- Official website: rtvslo.si

Radiotelevizija Slovenija (English: Radio-Television of Slovenia) – usually abbreviated to RTV Slovenija, RTV SLO (or simply RTV within Slovenia) – is Slovenia's national public broadcasting organization.

Based in Ljubljana, it has regional broadcasting centres in Koper and Maribor and correspondents around Slovenia, Europe, and the world. RTV Slovenija's national radio services operate under the name Radio Slovenija, while the television division carries the name Televizija Slovenija or TV Slovenija. The names are sometimes Anglicized as Radio Slovenia and TV Slovenia, respectively. There are three national and four regional radio services, which can all be heard online as well. RTV Slovenija also finances the RTV Slovenia Symphony Orchestra and the RTV Slovenia Big Band.

The legal foundation for the institution is the Radiotelevizija Slovenija Act (Slovene: Zakon o Radioteleviziji Slovenija). It is the only public nonprofit broadcasting organization in Slovenia to operate both radio and television stations. The law also requires it to air radio and television services for the country's two indigenous linguistic minorities, which it does in collaboration with the regional broadcasting centres in Maribor (for the Hungarian-speaking minority) and in Koper (for the Italian-speaking minority). Approximately 73% of RTV Slovenija's funding comes from television licence fees.

== History ==
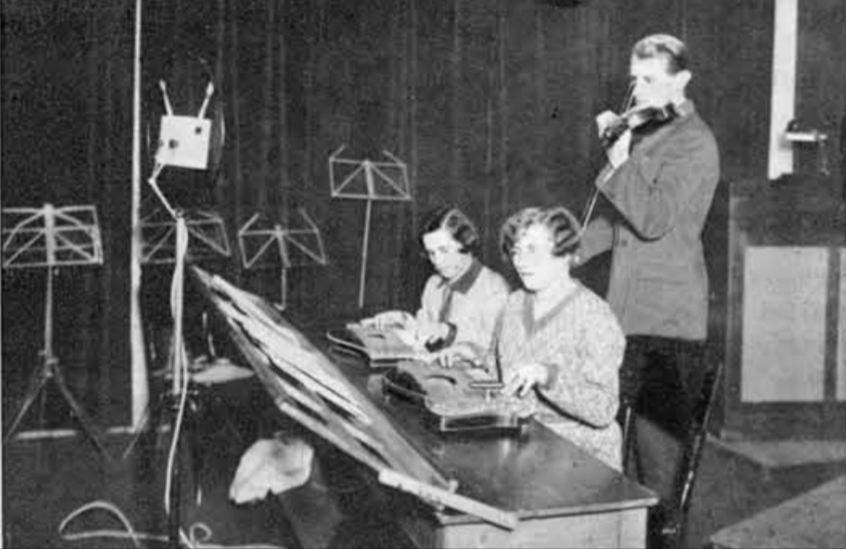
Slovenian composer and zither player Dragica Legat Košmerl (centre) performing with a trio on Radio Ljubljana in 1929

Radio Ljubljana signed on the air for the first time on September 1, 1928, with experimental broadcasts. By October 28 the radio station had a scheduled programme. On April 11, 1941, the station's transmitter in Domžale was destroyed and the station was occupied by Italy.

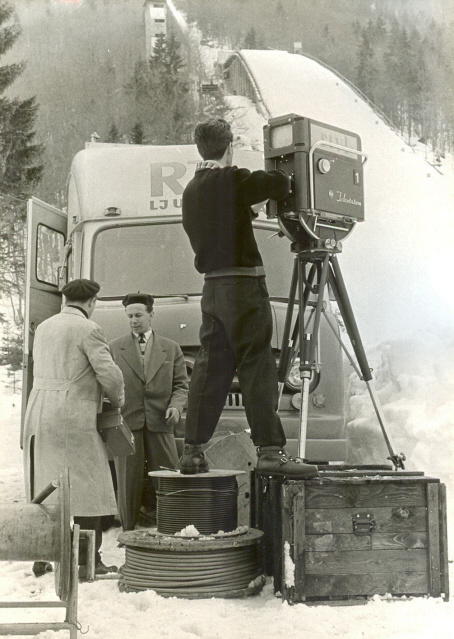
TV Ljubljana's first broadcast for Eurovision in 1960

On April 1, 1949, the first TV laboratory was established in Ljubljana, but was separate from the radio station. However, the task of setting up a television service was eventually assigned to Radio Ljubljana. Second radio program started in 1951. On November 11, 1958, the TV channel got a regular schedule, but it was shared by other Yugoslav republics, with TV Ljubljana getting around 30% of airtime. TV Ljubljana produced its first broadcast for Eurovision, showing ski jumping in Planica, in 1960. During that decade, the amount of programming produced exclusively for Slovenian audiences increased. On April 15, 1968, the main evening newscast was broadcast in Slovene for the first time. It had previously originated in Belgrade and was produced in Serbo-Croatian.

In 1970, the RTV Slovenia record label was established. In 1971, TV Koper/Capodistria, a subsidiary of RTV Ljubljana, was launched as the first bilingual TV station in Slovenia, serving the Italian community in Slovenia and Croatia. Private companies built transmitters and translators in various parts of Italy that made TV Koper-Capodistria (generally known as "Telecapodistria" in Italy) available to millions of Italians. Because the station used the PAL color standard, Italians bought PAL TV sets in large numbers, ending the hopes of the French government that Italy might adopt its SECAM system instead. With the advent of privately owned, purely commercial television in Italy, the station's popularity eventually began to diminish.

Starting from 1974, TV Ljubljana's main service was also gradually converted to color. In 1981, they aired the children's television series 40 Green Elephants. In 1984, teletext was introduced, whereas the digitalization started in 1986. In the 90s, Radio Ljubljana started transmitting an RDS signal.

At first, TV Ljubljana's second television network primarily relayed programs from other Yugoslav television stations. In the late 1980s, however, the percentage of TV Ljubljana's own programs on the second network increased.

In the year when Slovenia became independent in 1991, the institution was renamed Radiotelevizija Slovenija (from RTV Ljubljana). On January 1, 1993, RTV Slovenija was admitted as a member of the European Broadcasting Union following the collapse of Yugoslavia, and began participation in the Eurovision Song Contest.

In the mid- to late 1990s, TV Slovenia began to face increased competition from Slovenia's commercial television stations. In 1995, RTV Slovenija published its first web page. Radio digitalization started in 1995, whereas the digitalization of television broadcasting started in 1999.

In 1997, satellite broadcasting started via Hot Bird 3. In 2001, RTV Slovenija's Multimedia Centre was established to help introduce new technologies. A new multimedia web portal was introduced in 2002. This portal includes regular news updates, broadcast archives, and the live transmission on line of most services, both radio and television. RSS feeds were introduced in 2005. The public broadcaster referendum, 2005 was approved by a slight majority of voters, but the referendum saw a very low turnout. On November 12, 2005, a law was passed stating that Radio-television Slovenia is "a public institution of special cultural and national importance..."

In May 2008 TV Slovenia began airing a new TV channel, TV Slovenija 3, dedicated primarily to live Parliament coverage. In August 2008 TV Slovenia broadcast their first HD event – Olympic Games 2008 on test DVB-T channel. The Slovenian public broadcaster law referendum, 2010 was rejected by voters. In 2011, analogue signal was abandoned.

== Legal framework ==
The 1994 Law on RTV Slovenia regulates public broadcasting. RTV Slovenia has a Programming Council and a supervisory board; RTV is required by law to be independent and autonomous, to respect human integrity and dignity in its programs, to observe the principle of impartiality, and to ensure the truthfulness of information and the pluralism of opinions and religious beliefs. The law also requires the public broadcaster to provide radio and TV programs for the Italian and Hungarian minorities in Slovenia.

After EU accession, the new 2005 Law on RTV Slovenia reintroduced a dominant role of the state and the executive in the appointment of RTV's governing bodies, excluding civil society institutions (e.g. universities, association of writers, and sports organisations) which were previously involved. The draft law raised several domestic and international criticisms, including from the International Federation of Journalists and the Council of Europe, but the Slovenian institutions dismissed most of them and went along with adopting the new law in November 2005, which was later narrowly confirmed by 50.7% of voters in a special referendum.

The current governance system of RTV Slovenia allows control over almost all managerial bodies and over the appointment of all key editors to the governmental majority. Majority parties also control the majority of the new Programming Council and supervisory board of RTVS, thus being also able to appoint RTVS' Director General, who will in turn appoint and manage the directors of radio and TV, the editors-in-chief, and the senior management. This governance system is deemed a threat to the independence and credibility, trust, and respect with the public of RTV Slovenia by the European Journalism Centre. The following period indeed saw a host of cases of political interference in the editorial and journalistic work of the Slovenian public broadcaster, whose public credibility (particularly for the TV) fell dramatically.

The Varuh pravic poslušalcev in gledalcev ("Listener and Viewer Ombudsman") of RTV Slovenia was appointed for the first time in 2008, according to art.16 of the RTV Slovenia Law, to "address the comments and suggestions of viewers and listeners" and "give instructions to the director-general regarding changes that must be effected on channels."

== Radio services ==
=== National ===
RTV Slovenija's national radio networks are based in Ljubljana and broadcast in Slovene. They can be heard throughout Slovenia.

- Prvi program (first programme): A traditional generalist service carrying news and news reports, a variety of specialized broadcasts, and a wide range of music
- Radio Val 202: An indie-pop oriented service with the emphasis on pop and rock music, news bulletins and updates, talk segments, lifestyle reports, and live sports coverage
- ARS: A cultural service concentrating on classical music, radio drama, and other cultural programming
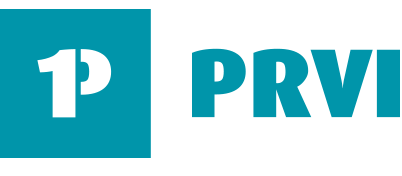
Prvi logo (2015)

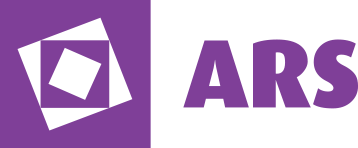
ARS logo (2015)

=== Regional ===
RTV Slovenija's regional radio stations are based in regional RTV centres, and broadcast in Slovenian and/or the languages of the indigenous minorities in the area. They can be heard only in their own regions.

The stations are:

- Radio Koper (in Slovenian, based in Koper, received in the Slovenian Littoral)
- Radio Capodistria (in Italian, based in Koper, received in Friuli-Venezia Giulia, Slovenian Littoral, and Istria)
- Radio Maribor (in Slovenian, based in Maribor, received in Northeastern Slovenia)
- Pomurski madžarski radio (Hungarian: Muravidéki Magyar Rádió, MMR): broadcasting in Hungarian with Hungarian folk and mostly pop music, based in RTV Maribor's Lendava studio (received in Prekmurje)
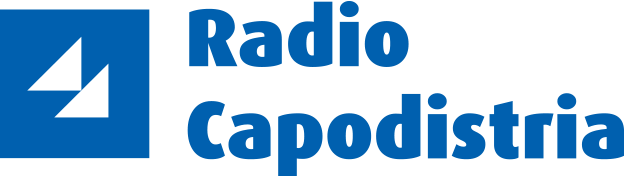
Radio Capodistria

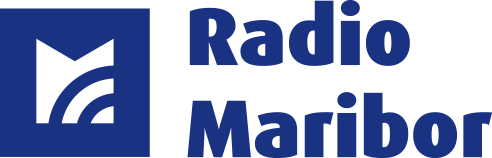
Radio Maribor

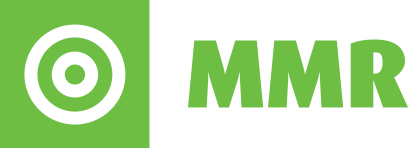
Muravidéki Magyar Rádió (MMR)

=== Other ===
Other radio services:

- Radio Slovenia International (RSi); broadcast in English and German, based in Maribor, heard in various places around Slovenia and southeastern Austria; for expatriates, tourists, English-speaking Slovenians, and foreigners

== Television services ==
RTV Slovenija operates three national and two regional television services. All except Tele M can be watched online.

=== National ===
RTV Slovenija's national television networks can be watched all over Slovenia and are based in Ljubljana. They are broadcast in Slovenian.

- TV SLO 1: A general-interest television service with newscasts, feature films, documentaries, talk shows, series, children's programming, variety shows, and live coverage of significant national events.
- TV SLO 2: A more specialized service with programs generally aimed at narrower audiences, sitcoms, a wide range of commercials interrupted by live sports coverage, but virtually no news.
- TV SLO 3: Specialized service dedicated to airing full unedited proceedings of the Slovenian Parliament and Committees live, it also features documentaries, interviews and news.

=== Regional ===
Each of the regional RTV centres has its own television facilities. While TV Koper/Capodistria is bilingual (Italian and Slovenian), the Hungarian public has no regional station, but has regular broadcasts on TV Slovenija 1.

The regional stations are:

- TV Koper-Capodistria (in Slovenian and Italian, based in Koper, received in Primorska, Istria, and parts of Friuli-Venezia Giulia via a terrestrial signal, via satellite signal from Hot Bird 13° East and throughout Slovenia via cable as well as German language throughout Koper)
- TV Maribor (in Slovenian, based in Maribor, received in Northeastern Slovenia) Also has Hungarian-language programming.

== Presentation history ==
RTV SLO's official logo is Boy with a Flute and name in two versions: a longer "RADIOTELEVIZIJA SLOVENIJA" or a shorter "RTV SLO".

=== Test cards ===
The test card TV Slovenija is PM5544, introduced in the 1960s. Nowadays test cards are rarely broadcast.

- 1960s/1970s to 1980s: PM5544 with upper text "JRT" and lower text "RTV-LJNA".
- 1980s to September 1990: The testcard has again been modified, where updated upper text to "RTV-1" or "RTV-2" & lower text to "LJUBLJANA".
- Since September 1990: Modified testcard. Upper text is "TV", lower text is "SLOVENIJA".

=== Closing and opening times ===
==== SLO1 ====
- 1960s/1970s to 1980s: opens at 11:30 and close at 22:30, along with other stations of the Yugoslav Radio Television broadcast system
- 1980s to June 25, 1991: opens at 08:00 and close at 23:00, along with other stations of the Yugoslav Radio Television broadcast system
- 25 June 1991 – 1994: opens at 08:00 and close at 00:00
- 1994–1996/97: opens at 06:00 and close at 00:30
- 1996/97–2001: opens at 05:30 and close at 01:00
- 2001–2004: opens at 05:00 and close at 01:30
- 2004–present: 24-hour

==== SLO2 ====
- 1970s to September 1990, June 25, 1991: opens at 18:00 and close at 22:00, along with other Yugoslavian channel 2's
- September 1990, June 25, 1991 – 1994: opens at 11:00 and close at 23:00
- 1994–2000: opens at 09:30 and close at 00:00
- 2000–2004: opens at 06:00 and close at 01:00
- 2004–present: 24-hour

==== SLO3 ====
- 2008–2010: opens at 08:00 and close at 00:00
- 2010–present: 24/7

==== SLO1 Dnevnik ====
Dnevnik Televizije Slovenija is a daily news show.

- 1960s to 1990s: starts at 20:00; ends at 20:15
- 1990s to 2003: starts at 19:30: ends at 20:00
- 2003–present: starts at 19:00; ends at 20:00

== See also ==
- Media in Slovenia
