= Pro Plus (company) =

Pro Plus, d.o.o
- Company type: Subsidiary
- Industry: Mass media
- Founded: 1995; 31 years ago
- Headquarters: Ljubljana, Slovenia
- Key people: Pavel Vrabec (CEO)
- Services: Broadcasting; Television production
- Revenue: €62 million (2023)
- Net income: €1.4 million (2023)
- Number of employees: 273 (2023)
- Parent: CME
- Website: pro-plus.si

Pro Plus is the leading media company in broadcasting and production of television content in Slovenia. It operates the commercial broadcasting programs POP TV, Kanal A, Brio, Oto, Astra, and Kino, as well as the most visited news website in the country, 24ur.com. Additionally, it manages specialized websites such as zadovoljna.si, bibaleze.si, cekin.si, vizita.si, moškisvet.com, okusno.je, and dominvrt.si.

In September 2011, Pro Plus launched the first Slovenian S-VOD (subscription video on demand) service called VOYO, a multiplatform service with varied content. VOYO is now live in six countries and, as of February 2024, has surpassed 1 million subscribers across its markets.

Pro Plus is owned by CME, and its CEO is Stella Litou.

== Main TV channels ==
POP TV is a Slovenian commercial television channel operated by Pro Plus. It is the TV channel with the highest ratings in Slovenia and includes the most-watched daily news program, 24UR.

Kanal A is known as the first commercial television station in Slovenia with national coverage. The second most-watched TV channel in Slovenia offers film premieres and eternal classics, as well as UEFA Champions League and Moto GP coverage.

== Thematic channels ==
Pro Plus also offers thematic channels BRIO, OTO, Astra, and KINO. Brio is an all-day channel that includes the latest and most popular humoristic, crime, and reality series. Oto is the only Slovenian all-day children's channel with cartoons dubbed in Slovene. Kino is the first channel with all-day film programming of all genres. The channel includes a large choice of films, from commercial hits to film marathons, while Astra offers viewers a wide selection of comedies, crime dramas, and series from the Adriatic region.

== Web sites ==
Pro Plus' 24ur.com news website is the most visited website in Slovenia. Other Pro Plus-operated thematic websites, such as zadovoljna.si, bibaleze.si, cekin.si, vizita.si, moškisvet.com, okusno.je, and dominvrt.si, also rank among the 30 most visited in the country.
