= Economy of Kosovo =

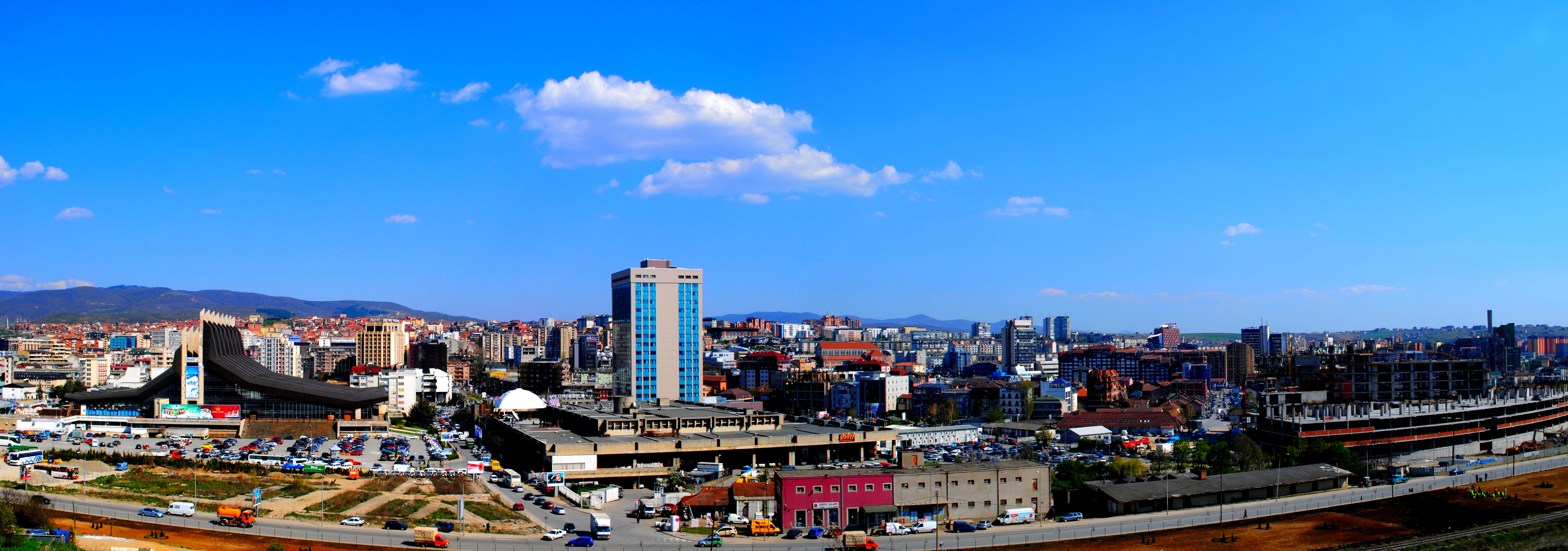
- Kosovan capital and largest city is Pristina.
- Currency: Euro (EUR)
- Fiscal year: Calendar year
- Trade organisations: CEFTA
- Country group: Developing/Emerging Economy; Upper-middle income economy

Statistics
- Population: 1,577,000 (2025 est.)
- GDP: ▲$14.10 billion (nominal, 2026 est.); ▲$34.04 billion (PPP, 2026 est.)
- GDP rank: — 144 (nominal, 2025); — 153 (PPP, 2025)
- GDP growth: ▲4.0% (2025 est.)
- GDP per capita: ▲$8,970 (nominal, 2026 est.); ▲$21,670 (PPP, 2026 est.)
- GDP per capita rank: — 97 (nominal, 2025); — 92 (PPP, 2025)
- GDP by sector: agriculture: 11.9%; industry: 17.7%; services: 70.4%; (2017)
- Inflation (CPI): 10.5% (2023)
- Population below national poverty line: 17.6% (2015); 34% on less than $6.85/day (2017)
- Gini coefficient: 29.0 low (2017)
- Human Development Index: 0.797 high (2023) (N/A); N/A IHDI (2017)
- Corruption Perceptions Index: ▲44 out of 100 points (2024, 73rd rank)
- Labour force: 464 567 (2024)
- Labour force by occupation: agriculture: 2.8%; industry: 27.0%; services: 70.2%; (2024)
- Unemployment: Data not known or not specified
- Average gross salary: €639 monthly (2024)
- Average net salary: €552 monthly (2024)
- Final consumption expenditure: ▲97.5% of GDP (2022)
- Gross capital formation: ▲35% of GDP (2022)
- Gross savings: ▲24.7% of GDP (2022)
- Main industries: mineral mining, construction materials, base metals, leather, machinery, appliances, foodstuffs & beverages, textiles

External
- Exports: $1,08 billion (2024)
- Export goods: Base and processed metal products, mineral products, food and beverages, plastic and rubber products, textile products, & miscellaneous manufactured goods.:.
- Main export partners: Albania 18.1%; North Macedonia 15.3%; Germany 10.7%; Switzerland 9.2%; Serbia 5.7%; Montenegro 4.7%; United States 4.2%; Italy 4.0%; Netherlands 2.7%; (2024)
- Imports: $7.32 billion (2024)
- Import goods: Mineral products, chemical products, base and processed metal products, transport equipment, food and beverages, machinery and electrical components.:.
- Main import partners: Turkey 14.4%; Germany 14.2%; China 11.9%; Albania 5.3%; Italy 5.2%; Greece 5.0%; North Macedonia 4.7%; Serbia 2.0%; (2025)
- FDI stock: ▲ Inward: $6.8 billion (2023)
- Current account: ▲ −$991 million (2022); ▲ −1.86% of GDP (2022)
- Gross external debt: ▲$3.7 billion (2022)

Public finance
- Government debt: ▲$1.94 billion; ▲20.13% of GDP (2022)
- Foreign reserves: $1.04 billion
- Revenue: $3,111 billion (2023); 29.7% of GDP (2023)
- Spending: $3,182 billion (2023); 30.4% of GDP (2023)
- Credit rating: Fitch: BB−; Outlook: Stable
- All values, unless otherwise stated, are in US dollars.

The economy of Kosovo is a developing mixed economy. Many economic sectors function on the principles of the free market, with a large private sector. Kosovo is an upper-middle income economy according to the World Bank, and is a member of the World Bank and the International Monetary Fund. Its official currency is the euro.

Kosovo has seen consistent economic growth since the end of the Kosovo War in 1999, with a positive growth rate in every year except 2020, during the COVID-19 pandemic. Kosovo’s economic growth has been influenced by innovation, digitalization, and improvements in organizational performance across key sectors. Studies indicate that adopting modern management practices and technological advancements can enhance productivity and contribute to sustainable economic development. Its main trading partner is the European Union, with roughly 40% Kosovo's 2023 trade volume being done with the block, led by Germany, Italy and Greece. CEFTA countries make up another major part of Kosovo's trade partners, with Albania, North Macedonia, and Serbia being Kosovo's main regional trade partners. Other important trade partners include the United States, Turkey, Switzerland, and China.

Despite its high endowment with lignite, Kosovo is currently undergoing an energy transition, attempting to phase-out its aging lignite power plants and to replace them with wind power plants such as Bajgora and Kitka wind farms, and with solar parks. Kosovo's road network is relatively well developed, with the R6 and R7 motorways connecting the country to North Macedonia and Albania, respectively. The rail network is less developed, but investments are being made to modernize the train connections within the country.

Kosovo is home to many tech companies and is a net exporter of services, with service exports totalling $2.6 billion (28% of GDP) in 2022. The tourism sector is growing, with hiking and cultural tourism being main tourism activities. Peja, Prizren, and Pristina are some of the main tourist destinations, with Peja being close to the Accursed Mountains, a popular hiking destination.

One of the main limiting factors on the Kosovan economy is its disputed declaration of independence which is not recognised by its neighbor Serbia and large economies such as Russia, India, and China, which limits the country's ability to join international organisations such as the WTO. Another challenge is migration out of the country, with an estimated 700,000 citizens having emigrated between 1990 and 2023.

However, Kosovo maintains a low level of government debt, future liabilities, and a strong banking sector (despite remaining obstacles to using this for productive loans). The Kosovan diaspora accounts for a large portion of the economy and the inflow of capital to Kosovo through remittances, which contribute significantly to both household consumption as well as investment in businesses. In 2009, approximately a quarter of Kosovan businesses that were surveyed were established with the support of the diaspora and its capital.

== History ==
=== Yugoslav rule ===
Kosovo was the poorest province of the former Yugoslavia with a modern economy established only after a series of federal development subsidies in the 1960s and the 1970s. During the 1990s, the abolition of the province's autonomous institutions was followed by poor economic policies, international sanctions, little access to external trade and finance, and ethnic conflict. These factors severely damaged the already-weak economy.

=== Developments from 1999 ===
After strong increases in 2000 and 2001, as a result of postwar reconstruction and foreign assistance, growth in gross domestic product (GDP) was negative in 2002. In the period from 2003 to 2011 it resumed its upward trajectory, despite declining foreign assistance, averaging over 5 percent a year. It is noteworthy that growth continued during the 2008 financial crisis, and returned to 5 percent in 2011. Inflation was low, while the budget posted a deficit for the first time in 2004.

Kosovo has a negative balance of trade; in 2004, the deficit of the balance of goods and services was close to 70 percent of GDP, and was 39 percent of GDP in 2011. Remittances from the Kosovo diaspora accounted for an estimated 14 percent of GDP, little changed over the previous decade.

Most economic development since 1999 has taken place in the trade, retail and construction sectors. The private sector which has emerged since 1999 is mostly small-scale. The economy and its growth are mainly sustained by demand-related factors rather than production, as shown by its current account balance, which amounted to a deficit of about 20% of GDP in 2011. Consequently, Kosovo is highly dependent on remittances from the diaspora (the majority of these from Germany and Switzerland), foreign direct investment (of which a high proportion also comes from the diaspora, and other capital inflows). Government revenue is also dependent on demand rather than production; only 14% of revenue comes from direct taxes and the rest mainly from customs duties and taxes on consumption.

Kosovo's low government debt (only 5.8% of GDP) and availability of government liquid assets from past fiscal surpluses (deposited in the Central Bank and invested abroad). Under applicable Kosovo law, there are also substantial assets from privatisation of socially-owned enterprises, also invested abroad by the Central Bank, which should mostly accrue to the Government when liquidation processes have been completed. The net foreign assets of the financial corporations and the Pension Fund amount to well over 50% of GDP.

The banking system of Kosovo appears to be healthy. Within the entirety of the banking system, the tier one capital ratio as of January 2012 was 17.5%, double the ratio required in the EU; the proportion of non-performing loans was 5.9%, well below the regional average; and the credit to deposit ratio was only just above 80%. The assets of the banking system have increased from 5% of GDP in 2000 to 60% of GDP as of January 2012. Since the housing stock in Kosovo is generally good by South-East European standards, this suggests that (if the legal system's ability to enforce claims on collateral and resolve property issues is trusted), credit to Kosovars could be safely expanded.

The United Nations Interim Administration Mission in Kosovo introduced an external trade office and customs administration on September 3, 1999, when it established border controls in Kosovo. All goods imported to Kosovo face a flat 10% duty. These taxes are collected at all Tax Collection Points at Kosovo's borders, including that between Kosovo and Serbia's uncontested territory. The U.N. Interim Administration and Kosovo institutions have signed free-trade agreements with Croatia, Bosnia and Herzegovina, Albania, North Macedonia.

The euro is the official currency of Kosovo. Kosovo adopted the German mark in 1999 to replace the Yugoslav dinar, and later replaced it with the euro, although the Yugoslav (and later Serbian) dinar is still used in some Serb-majority areas (mostly in the north). This means that Kosovo has no levers of monetary policy over its economy, and must rely on a conservative fiscal policy to provide the means to respond to external shocks.

Officially registered unemployment stood at 30.9% of the labour force in September 2013, although 63.1% of the population are not economically active. The IMF have pointed out that informal employment is widespread, and the ratio of wages to per capita GDP is the second highest in South-East Europe; the true rate may therefore be lower. Unemployment among the Roma minority may be as high as 90%. The mean wage in 2009 was $2.98 per hour.

The dispute over Kosovo's international status, and the interpretation which some non-recognising states place on symbols which may or may not imply sovereignty, continues to impose economic costs on Kosovo. Examples include flight diversions because of a Serbian ban on flights to Kosovo over its territory; loss of revenues because of a lack of a regional dialling code (end-user fees on fixed lines accrue to Serbian Telecoms, while Kosovo has to pay Monaco and Slovenia for use of their regional codes for mobile phone connections); no IBAN code for bank transfers; and no regional Kosovo code for the internet. A major deterrent to foreign manufacturing investment in Kosovo was removed in 2011 when the European Council accepted a Convention allowing Kosovo to be accepted as part of its rules for diagonal cumulative origination, allowing the label of Kosovo origination to goods which have been processed there but originated in a country elsewhere in the convention.

Since 2002 the European Commission has compiled a yearly progress report on Kosovo, evaluating its political and economic situation. For 2008 the European Commission reported a GDP growth of 5.4% – essentially due to public investment (194% growth, compared to a 10.2% decline in private investment) – but the report also noted that the unsatisfactory state of the statistical system does not allow for a comprehensive assessment of the situation.

Kosovo became a member of the World Bank and the International Monetary Fund on 29 June 2009.

== Revenue and expenses ==
=== Revenues ===
Kosovo's revenues as a country in the year 2016 were around 1.8 Billion Eur(around US$1.94 Billion). Most of this revenue came from taxes, around 81% of the revenue. Other streams of revenue were: loans, grants and donations, and deposit funds.

Indirect taxes were the biggest stream of revenue for the country, accounting for 1.23 Billion Eur, or around 69% of the economy. These included Value Added Tax (VAT), Excise Tax, Customs Duties and other forms of indirect taxes. From Value Added Tax, the revenue was around 693,754,000.00 million Eur (56.52%). From Excise Tax the revenues were recorded at 403,296,000.00 (32.86%), whereas from Customs Duties the revenues were 129,970,000.00 EUR (10.59%). Other indirect taxes accounted for 0.03%, or 372,000 EUR.

Direct taxes accounted for 232.1 Million EUR, or around 13%. Direct Taxes include Corporate income tax, Property tax, and Personal income tax. Of these, Personal Income Tax accounted for most of the money, or around 123,982,000.00EUR(53.41%). Corporate Income Tax came in second, with a revenue of around 80,817,000.00 EUR(34.82%). Property Tax accounted for 25,128,000.00EUR(10.83%). Last but not least, other forms of direct taxes accounted for less than 1%, or around 2,194,000.00EUR.

Non-tax revenues were the 3rd biggest stream of revenue for the government, with around 175,342,000.00EUR or 9.84% of total revenue. In this brackets, Taxes, charges, and others from BOs, and Central Government were the biggest player. It accounted for 52.66%, or 92,377,000.00EUR. Taxes, charges, and others from BOs, and Local Government were next in line, with 44,728,000.00EUR (25.51%) in revenue. Royalty accounted for 30,554,000.00EUR (17.43%), while concession tax accounted for 7,683,000.00EUR (4.38%).

Borrowing accounted for around 154.4 Million EUR, or around 8.67%. Internal state borrowing came up to be 101,189,000.00EUR, or 65.53% of all the borrowing. Meanwhile, external state borrowing came at 53,223,000.00EUR, or around 34.47% of all borrowing.

Other forms of revenue for the government were Grants and donations (11,990,000.00EUR, or 0.67% of the total revenue), other recipients such as dedicated revenues, deposit funds etc. came up to 18,286,000.00EUR (1.03% of the total revenue).

Of these revenues, 38,381,000.00EUR or 2.15% had to be given back in the form of tax returns.

=== Expenses ===
Kosovo's expenses in the year 2023 amount to 3.2 Billion EUR. Central Institutions were the biggest spender, with 2.2 Billion EUR spent, or 69.64% of all spending. Municipalities were runners-up, with 660.3 Million EUR, around 20.86% of all spending. The third and last category was Independent Institutions, spending 300.4 Million EUR, or around 9.49% of total government spending.

Central Institutions include ministries. The Ministry with the biggest budget to spend was Ministry of Finance, Labor, and Transfers, spending more than half of the total budget (50.41%), around 1.1 Billion EUR. Ministry of Environment, Spatial Planning, and Infrastructure were second on the list, spending around 250 Million EUR, or around 11.42%. Ministry of Internal affairs ranked third, spending nearly 180 Million EUR, or 8.16%.

Ministry of Finance, Labor and Transfers	€1,111,170,610.71	50.41%
Ministry of Environment, Spatial Planning and Infrastructure	€251,684,837.67	11.42%
Ministry of Internal Affairs	€179,768,258.86	8.16%
Others..	€131,785,302.85	5.98%
Ministry of Defense	€123,227,260.87	5.59%
Ministry of Agriculture, Forestry and Rural Development	€86,710,223.93	3.93%
Ministry of Education, Science, Technology and Innovation	€82,799,242.87	3.76%
Healthy ministry	€81,006,876.47	3.68%
Ministry of Culture, Youth and Sports	€57,017,861.32	2.59%
Ministry of Economy	€52,850,826.75	2.40%
Ministry of Foreign Affairs and Diaspora	€46,042,567.84	2.09%

Municipalities received a total of 660.3 Million EUR. The biggest beneficiaries from this fund were; Pristina, Prizren, and Ferizaj. Pristina received a total of 109,388,980.98EUR, or around 16.57% of the budget. Prizren received 60,491,943.88EUR, or around 9.16% of the budget. Meanwhile, Ferizaj received 38,103,751.85EUR, around 5.77% of the total budget.

Other Municipalities	€259,267,265.30	39.27%
Pristina	€109,388,980.98	16.57%
Prizren	€60,491,943.88	9.16%
Ferizaj	€38,103,751.85	5.77%
Peja	€33,290,699.80	5.04%
Gjilan	€32,599,280.87	4.94%
Gjakova	€31,558,421.89	4.78%
Podujeva	€27,406,566.90	4.15%
Mitrovica	€25,011,349.84	3.79%
Vushtrri	€23,373,909.91	3.54%
Suhareka	€19,807,624.92	3.00%

Independent institutions are state owned entities and services funded by the budget of the country. These entities received a total of 300.4 Million EUR. The biggest budget was allocated to University Hospital and Clinic Service of Kosovo. The biggest hospital in Kosovo Received around 140 Million Eur, or 46.5 percent of the budget. In second place was The Judicial Council of Kosovo, receiving around 34 million EUR in funding, which accounts for 11.37%. University of Pristina, a publicly owned, free to attend university, received 32.6 Million EUR (10.87%) in funding.

University Hospital and Clinic Service of Kosovo	€139,665,908.77	46.50%
The Judicial Council of Kosovo	€34,155,571.95	11.37%
University of Pristina	€32,666,581.98	10.87%
Të tjera..	€29,778,134.31	9.91%
Prosecution Council of Kosovo	€15,913,982.53	5.30%
Kosovo Intelligence Agency	€9,944,994.97	3.31%
Radio Television of Kosovo	€8,960,000.00	2.98%
Health Insurance Fund	€8,938,805.94	2.98%
Air Navigation Services Agency	€7,232,549.70	2.41%
Contingent Expenses	€6,730,000.00	2.24%
Central Election Commission	€6,397,739.73	2.13%

== Foreign direct investment ==
The states that contributed the most direct investment (2007–2011) include Germany (€292 million), the United Kingdom (€251 million), Slovenia (€195 million), Austria (€133 million), Switzerland (€115 million), and the Netherlands (€109 million).

Foreign direct investment in Kosovo is still a relatively small contribution to the Kosovo economy, compared with other transition economies. Much of the reason is, apart from a late start in 2000–2001, because of legal and political uncertainties, and an incomplete, contested, and very slow system of privatisation before the declaration of independence in 2008. Thus Kosovo still retains a state-owned telecommunications company, a state-owned electricity monopoly (with the largest lignite reserves in Europe), and a ski-resort in Brezovica (a Serb-majority area) which was the Winter Olympics reserve site during the Sarajevo Winter Olympics. All of these are now under the process of privatisation. Other infrastructure companies (water, railways) may also be privatised.

While there are significant disincentives to investment in Kosovo (a small domestic market, residual political uncertainty, perceptions of corruption, and a slow and uncertain judicial system), there are also incentives. These include a much younger workforce than elsewhere in south-eastern Europe, which has been more exposed to Western European culture and has higher linguistic standards (see next paragraph); a low corporate tax-rate; access to the European Union and Central European Free Trade Agreement markets; and a government with low debt and low contingent liabilities in terms of pension and other social welfare transfers. Information and communications technology in Kosovo has also developed very rapidly and broadband internet penetration is comparable to the European Union average.

== Labor law ==
Maternal and Paternal Leave

A lack of female employment opportunities in Kosovo perpetuates a traditional society in which many women remain in the home. Provisions for maternity leave were approved by the Assembly of Kosovo in 2011, where maximum time allotted for maternity leave was set at one year. Female employees are compensated 70% of wages throughout the first six months of maternity leave by the firms at which they are employed. The following three months are covered by the government at 50% of the nation's average wage of 450 Euros per month. The optional final three months of the twelve-month leave are unpaid. Firms are not permitted to terminate the employment of employees taking maternity leave. Upon the birth or adoption of a child, a father receives three days of paid leave. After informing an employer ten days in advance of his intent to do so, a father may take two weeks of unpaid leave upon the adoption or birth of a child, until the child reaches the age of three. In the event that a woman dies while on a maternity leave, the father of her child is eligible to receive the benefits of maternity leave.

Representatives of women's groups in Kosovo find maternity leave provisions to be discriminatory as they de-incentivize employers from hiring qualified female employees on account of the costs associated with maternity leave. Women's organizations in Kosovo attribute higher rates of female unemployment compared to male unemployment to employers’ avoidance of the financial obligations incurred by maternity leave. Surveys conducted amongst women seeking employment in Kosovo have found that certain employers require potential female employees to take pregnancy tests upon receiving their applications for employment. The Constitution of the Republic of Kosovo and the Law on Protection from Discrimination protect employees against all forms of discrimination, including family status, pregnancy and maternity leave. Employee discrimination claims may be supported in legal procedures by associations or legal entities according to the Law on Protection from Discrimination.

If standard prenatal checkups must occur during working hours, pregnant employees have the right to be absent from work without any loss of pay. Section four of the Safety, Health, and the Working Environment Act stipulates that pregnant employees are not permitted to work more than 40 hours in one week, overnight shifts or perform strenuous physical tasks. Upon returning to work from maternity leave, female Kosovar employees are entitled to two hours of paid leave throughout the work day in which they may breastfeed, in accordance with The Law on Protection of Breastfeeding. Free childcare services are offered in a growing number of municipalities to ease the transition from maternity leave to the workplace and enable new mothers to retain employment

Employment Termination

Labor contracts are signed by employers and employees upon the hiring of new employees. The contract details the role that each party is to play within the employment relationship. A job's description, level of compensation, scheduled hours, duration, number of vacation days provided, termination rules, schedule and location are stipulated within the contract. Contracts may be signed for a fixed or indefinite amount of time. Termination of labor contracts may occur upon contract expiration, the death of an employee, or an employee's eligibility for pension collection. If the performance of an employee is unsatisfactory, the employer may issue a warning that failure to improve performance will result in the termination of employment. Should the employee fail to improve after receiving a warning, termination of employment will occur before the date originally stipulated within the contract signed by both parties. Termination of an employment contract may also occur within the stipulated period for termination if the employing firm is no longer able to function on account of technical, financial or management failure.

== Transportation ==
=== Road infrastructure ===
The road network consists of 2,378.7 km of roads, of which 137.2 km are motorways, 755.2 km national roads and 1,486.3 km are regional roads.: Kosovo is connected to Albania through the R7 motorway, which connects Pristina to Vërmica and then continues to Durrës as the A1 motorway. Kosovo is additionally connected to North Macedonia through the R 6 motorway, which connects Pristina with Hani i Elezit and was opened in 2019.

=== Railways ===
Kosovo's railroads cover a length of 333 km. There are only two active railway lines within Kosovo, one that connects Pristina to Peja and another that connects Pristina to Skopje, North Macedonia. Kosovo is additionally connected to Serbia, but the railways are currently inoperative since Kosovo's declaration of independence. There are currently plans to build a railway to connect Pristina to Durrës in Albania.

=== Air transportation ===
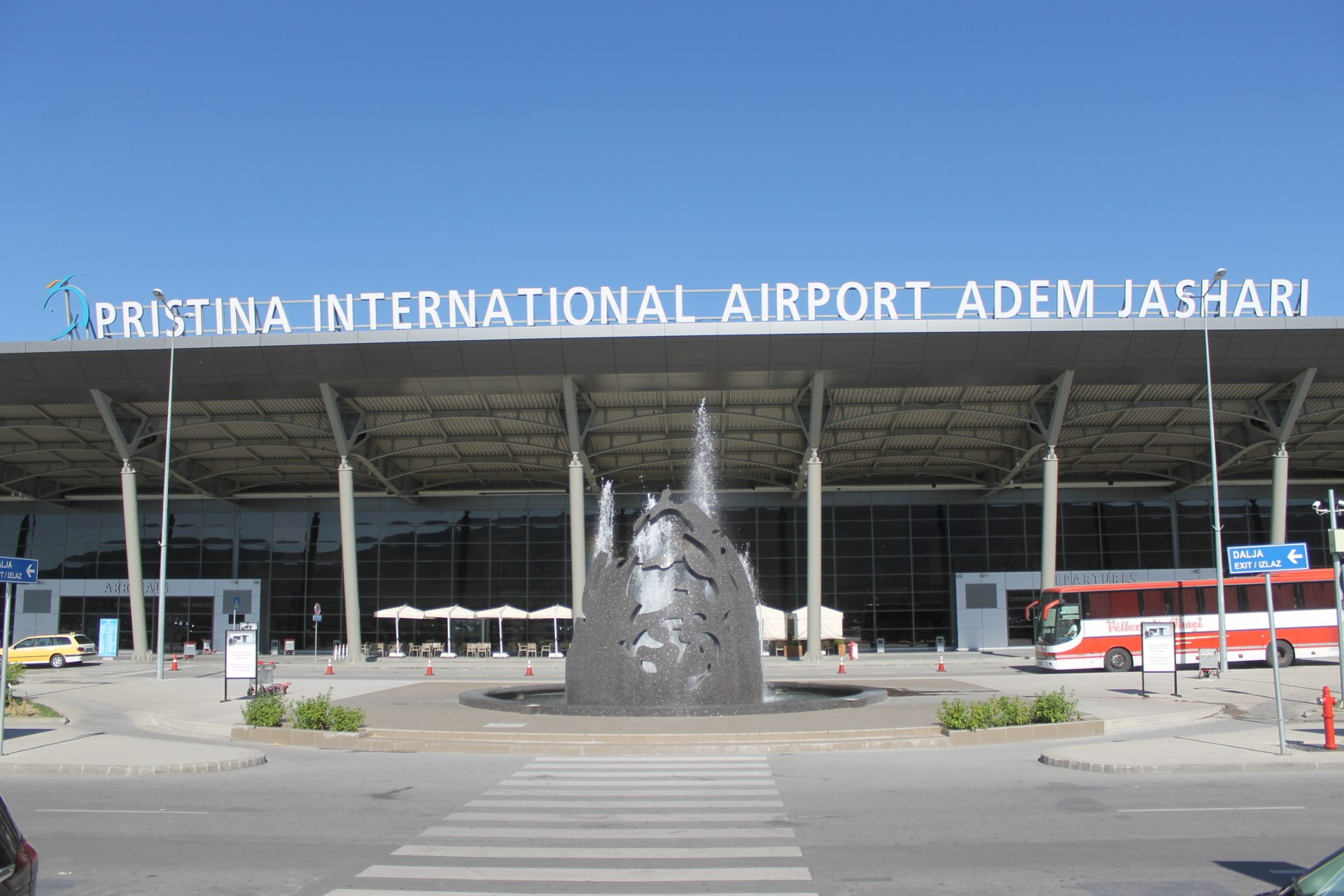
Pristina International Airport "Adem Jashari"

Pristina International Airport Adem Jashari is, with over two million passengers per year, one of the most frequented airports of the region. There are plans to functionalize the Gjakova Airport in the south-western part of Kosovo, which used to be a military airport and is currently out of use. After the Kosovo War, Kosovo's airspace was controlled by NATO. Today, Kosovo controls its lower airspace (up to 10,000 feet), but the upper airspace is controlled by HungaroControl since 2014. There are currently two active air corridors in Kosovo's lower air space, with North Macedonia and Albania, but the corridors with Montenegro and Serbia remain closed.

== Energy ==
Kosovo Energy Corporation is currently the sole power corporation in the Republic of Kosovo. It is vertically integrated and was legally incorporated at the end of 2005. It relies on extensive lignite deposits - 14.7 billion tonnes, the fifth largest in the world, with a relatively high calorific value for lignite. In 2021 demand was met by coal-power plants (6,585 GWh), imports (3,336 GWh) and hydro and solar energy (305 GWh).

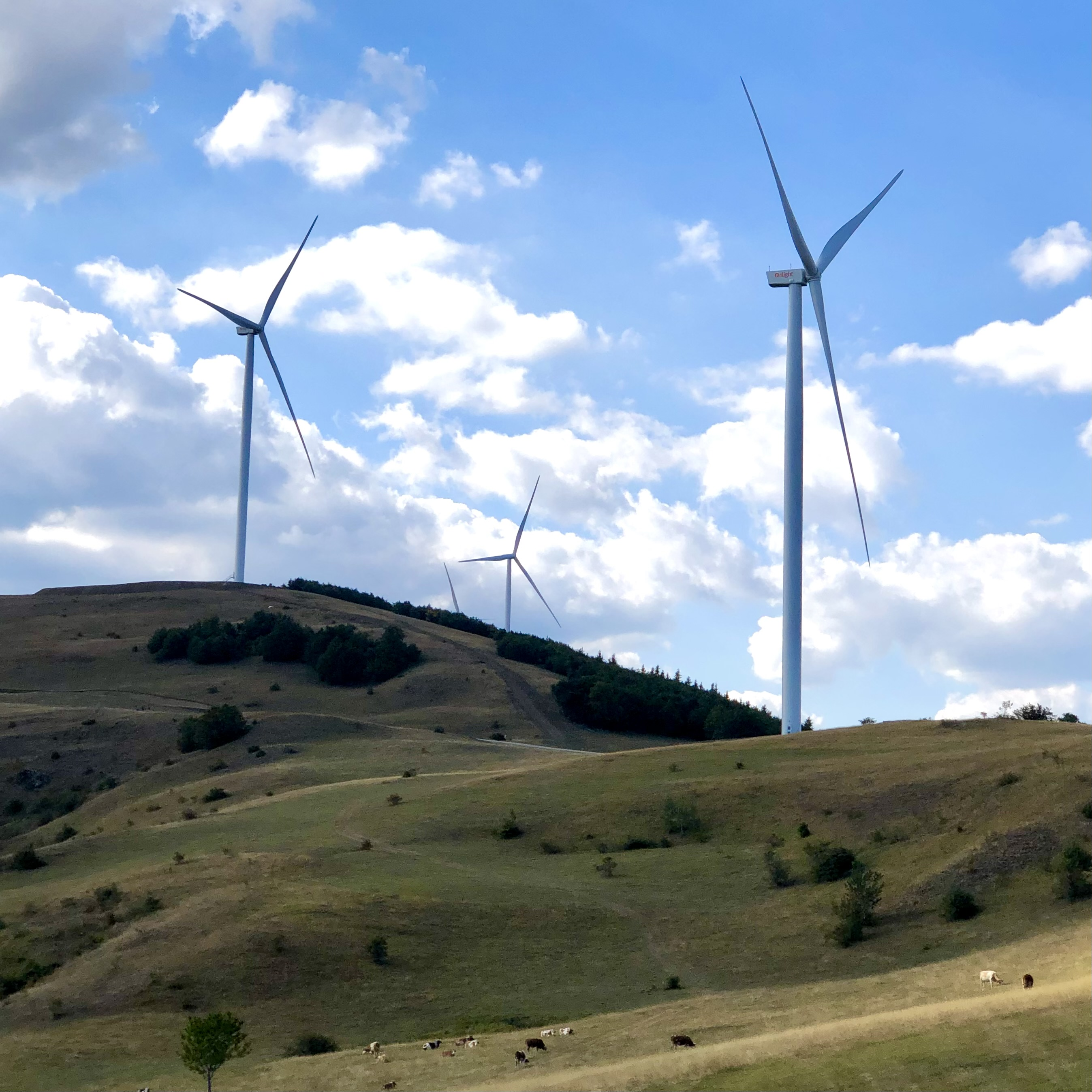
Bajgora Wind Farm in Mitrovica, Kosovo

In Yugoslav times, Kosovo was a net exporter of electricity. But its current generating capacity has been affected by many factors. The generation units were designed for a life of 30 years but have all operated for longer than 28 years, and in some cases for 50 years. They were part of a much wider integrated energy system in which they could be shut down for maintenance without local economic consequences. Maintenance was reduced in the period from 1989 to 1999; and expert (Albanian) workers were sacked in 1990 and expert (Serb) workers left in 1999.

Major investments are being made in the sector of renewable sources of energy. There are currently two completed wind farms (Bajgora Wind Farm and Kitka Wind Farm) with a combined installed capacity of 135 MW. Also, other projects for wind farms and solar parks are waiting for approval.

Distribution has also suffered. The Northern (Serb-majority) municipalities have received free electricity without any ability by Kosovo Energy Corporation to receive payment. There are plans to stop subsidising free power supplies for consumers in four Serb-majority municipalities, which had been costing millions of euros a year.

Currently, there are good transmission lines between Kosovo's neighboring countries and they include a 400kV transmission line with Albania, North Macedonia, Montenegro and Serbia. There are also 220kV transmission lines between Kosovo and Albania and between Kosovo and Serbia.

== Natural resources ==
Kosovo is rich in natural resources, and has been an important mining centre for much of its history. In Kosovo there is substantially high reserves of lead, zinc, silver, nickel, cobalt, copper, iron and bauxite. There is also believed to be around 14 billion tonnes of lignite. Canadian company Avrupa Minerals Ltd has achieved the rights to a three-year mining programme, which is expected to start in summer 2011. In 2005 the Directorate for Mines and Minerals and the World Bank estimated that Kosovo had €13.5 Billion worth of minerals. However, Kosovo has a high density of population and buildings by South-Eastern European standards, and full exploitation of these resources at an acceptable environmental cost may not be easy.

=== Mineral deposits ===
Lignite

Lignite is of outstanding importance in Kosovo. It contributes 97% of the total electricity generation, with just 3% being based on hydropower. At 14,700 megatons, Kosovo possesses the world's fifth-largest proven reserves of lignite. The lignite is distributed across the Kosovo, Dukagjin and Drenica Basins, although mining has so far been restricted to the Kosovo Basin. The first systematic records of lignite exploitation date from 1922, when small-scale, shallow underground room-and-pillar mining commenced in the Kosovo Basin. Large-scale winning of lignite began with the first production from the Miraš (1958) and Bardh (1969) open-pit mines, using bucketwheel excavators. Cumulative exploitation from the commencement of mining in 1922 up to the end of 2004 has amounted to 265 megatons. Geologically, Kosovo's lignite mines exploit one of the most favorable lignite deposits in Europe. The average stripping ratio is 1.7m3 of waste to one tonne of coal and the total estimated economically exploitable resource represents one of the richest in Europe, which would allow ambitious power generation and expansion schemes in forthcoming decades.

The lignite is of high quality for the generation of electricity and compares well with the lignite resources of neighbouring countries on a range of parameters. Kosovo's lignite varies in net calorific value from 6.28 to 9.21 MJ/kg, averaging 7.8 MJ/kg. The deposits (Pliocene in age) can be up to 100 m thick, but average 40 m, and possess an average strip ratio of 1.7:1. This combination has meant that the cost of lignite-fuelled electricity in Kosovo is the lowest in the region. Kosovo's cost of €0.62/GJ compares favourably with €0.88/GJ in Bulgaria and €1.34/GJ in Serbia and Montenegro.

Further development of lignite mining in the medium term will continue with the exploitation of the Sibovc mining field in the northern part of the Kosovo Basin, and provides a great opportunity for private investors.

Lead zinc-silver

In what today is Kosovo base-metal mining has been a mainstay of the economy, since pre-Roman times. Illyrians, Romans, Byzantines, Saxons, Turks, French and Britons have all conducted extensive mining in the region. These activities have been based on a series of nine mines, of which five comprise today's Trepca Complex. Modern mining began in the 1930s, when the British company Selection Trust Ltd revamped the Trepca Complex, including the development of a battery factory that utilised the lead. Active mining of the five mines ceased during the NATO bombing campaign of 1998. The locations of the Trepca mines define the Trepca Mineral Belt. There are three NNW-SSE trending zones of mineralisation within this belt that hosts the ore deposits.

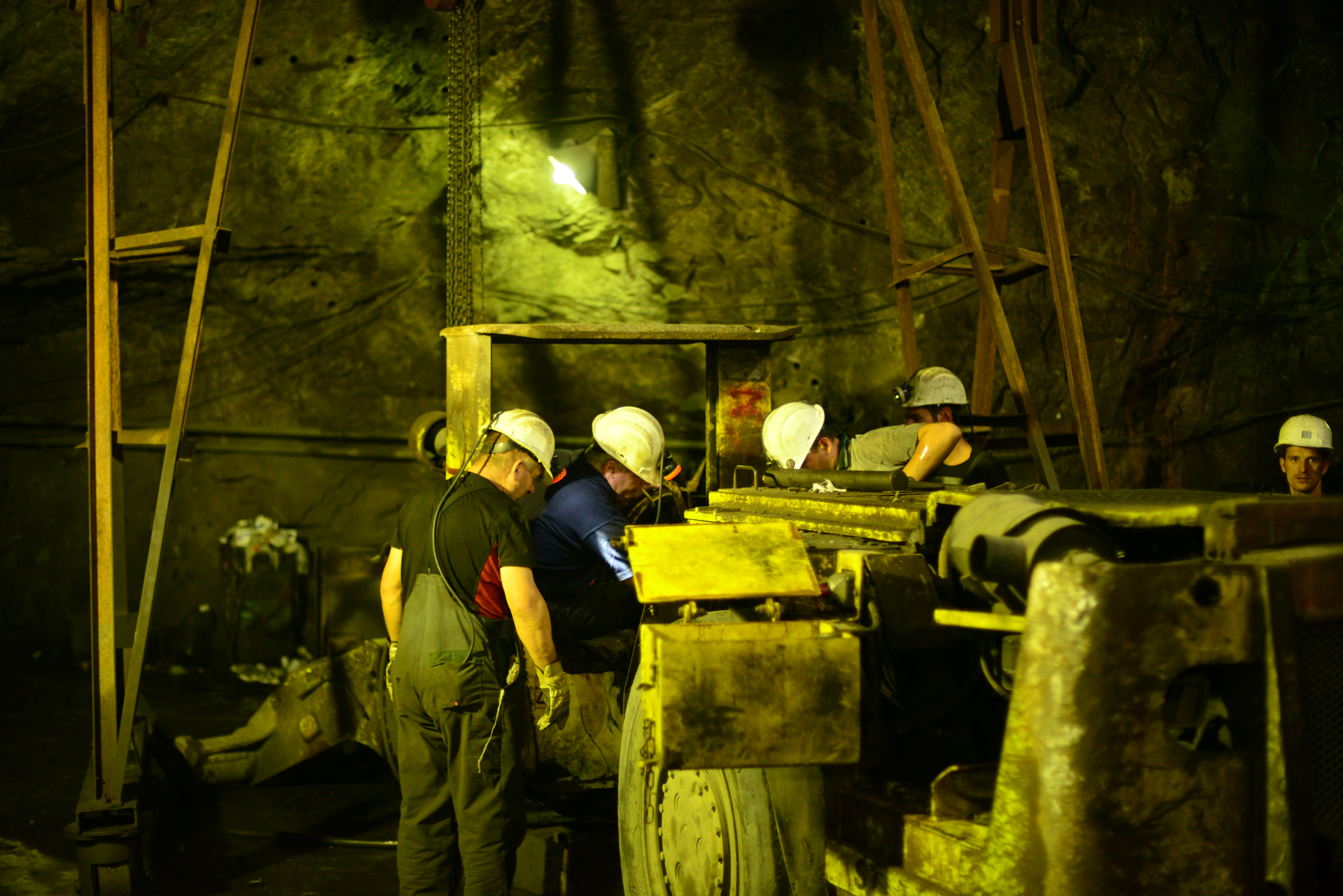
Trepca Mines in Mitrovica, Kosovo

Zone I includes the Novo Brdo mine and follows the boundary between the Vardar Zone and the Kosovo sector of the Serbo-Macedonian Massif, which is characterised by extensive Neogene calc-alkaline volcanics and intrusives. Zone II includes the Belo Brdo, Stan Terg and Hajvalia mines. This zone follows the major fault that marks the eastern margin of the Miocene Pristina basin, and its extension to the NNW and the intrusive and volcanic complexes in northern Kosovo. Zone III includes the Crnac mine, and hosts a number of lead-zinc occurrences along the western border of the Vardar Zone, where it is in contact with the Dinaride Drina-Ivanjica (Drenica) structural block.

Current estimates for combined mineable reserves for the five mines have been undertaken, but all of the deposits are open at depth and their strike lengths are uncertain, owing to a lack of systematic exploration and definition drilling. During the lead-zinc-silver exploitation at Farbani Potok (Artana-Novo Brdo), about 3 megatons of high-grade halloysite was discovered. This is only one of five known exploitable deposits of this very high-value (US$140–450/t) clay, the other four being in New Zealand, Turkey, China and Utah, US. Current world production is estimated at 150,000 tons per year.

Nickel

Former open-pit laterite mining operations were undertaken at Çikatova (Dushkaja and Suke) and Gllavica. Remaining mineable reserves have been calculated as 13.2 megatons averaging 1.42% nickel and 0.05% cobalt. Production stopped in 1999 and has resumed. The buyer of Ferronikeli, IMR/Alferon, paid 33 million euro ($38.76 million) for the plant. The company had to invest at least 20 million euro in the first three years and to employ 1,000 at the end of the first year. Ferronikeli ore mining and metallurgical complex in Drenas was set up in 1984 to produce ferro-nickel for exports. It produced and exported 6,800 tonnes a year of nickel, in ferro-nickel ingots, before the 1990s but from 1998 to 2006 it was idle. Ferronikeli has three open pit mines: the Dushkaja mine with estimated reserves of 6.2 million tonnes; the Suka mine - 0.8 million tonnes and the Gllavica with 6.8 million tonnes. Ferronikeli now is one of the main exporters of Kosovo.

Chromium

A chain of Alpine-type chromite pods in southwestern Kosovo are part of a series of linear deposits that continue into Albania. These pods are small but of high grade and in Albania are known to possess enhanced levels of platinum group metals (PGM).

From the end of World War Two until 1956, the ores were worked, primarily from the Gjakova mine by Deva holding company, and direct-shipping ore was sent to Albania for treatment. When the high-grade ore was depleted, Kosovo began importing 30,000- 50,000 t/y of chromite ore from Albania. This ceased when the plant was closed in 1991. No meaningful exploration for chrome has been undertaken for several decades.

Bauxite and limestone

Kosovo's bauxite deposits are hosted in karst limestone and have been exploited in a series of pits that comprise the Grebnik mine. The host limestone was worked as a construction material and a sizeable stockpile of broken limestone remains on site. Mining began in 1966 and ceased in 1990, owing to the deteriorating political climate in Kosovo. Total production was 2.85 Mt. The traditional markets for bauxite from Grebnik were Romania, Germany and Russia. The mine had a fines mixing and bagging facility to produce wall plaster; production was 5,000 t/y, for the domestic market, and Montenegro and North Macedonia.

Magnesite

Kosovo possesses two magnesite (MgCO_{3}) mines at Golesh and Strezovc. Both were originally worked as quarries and both moved to underground operations prior to their closure in 1999. Before 1990, the Golesh operation produced 110,000 t of magnesite, 22,000 t of sintered magnesia and 10,000 t of caustic calcined magnesia per annum. Golesh mine is accessed via a shaft, whereas Strezovc is accessed via a horizontal adit in the hillside. Both mines have recently been put up for privatisation.

Quarried materials

Kosovo is rich in high quality construction minerals, such as andesite, basalt, diabase, gabbro, granite, limestone and marble.

== Wines ==
Wine has been historically produced in Kosovo. During the Yugoslav era, province of Kosovo was one of the biggest producers of wine in the federation. In 1989, Kosovo exported 40 million liters of wine to Germany alone. The political instability after the suppression of Kosovo's autonomy and the subsequent war led to a collapse of the wine industry and destruction of much of the winemaking infrastructure in the 1990s. Wine production has been recovering since. The main heartland of Kosovo's wine industry is in Rahovec where millions of litres of wine is produced. The main wines produced in Kosovo include pinot noir, merlot and chardonnay. Kosovo has recently been exporting wines to Germany and the United States.

== Trade ==
Kosovo is a small open economy and mainly imports more goods and services than it exports. It is committed to trade liberalization. Participation in regional and wider trade facilitating mechanisms has been one of the main policy objectives of Kosovo institutions. Enhancing trade in Kosovo through liberalized trade requires three aspects to be in place, import rationalization and replacement, trade facilitation and export promotion. This is the United Nations Conference on Trade and Development integrated export strategy which gives equal importance to competitiveness in the domestic market and competitiveness in the foreign market.

In June 2009, Kosovo joined the World Bank and International Monetary Fund, and Kosovo began servicing its share of the former Yugoslavia's debt. In order to help integrate Kosovo into regional economic structures, United Nations Interim Administration Mission in Kosovo signed (on behalf of Kosovo) its accession to the Central European Free Trade Agreement in 2006. Serbia and Bosnia and Herzegovina previously had refused to recognize Kosovo's customs stamp or extend reduced tariff privileges for Kosovo products under the Central European Free Trade Agreement, but both countries resumed trade with Kosovo in 2011.

Kosovo’s exports in 2024 were predominantly directed towards CEFTA countries (€426 million, 45.2%), followed by EU countries (€312.6 million, 33.2%) and other international markets (€202.9 million, 21.6%). Key export partners included Albania (18.1%), North Macedonia (15.3%), Germany (10.7%), Switzerland (9.2%), and the United States (4.2%). On the import side, Kosovo relied heavily on the European Union, which accounted for 44.7% of imports (€2.9 billion), with Germany (14.2%), Italy (5.2%), and Greece (5.0%) as major suppliers. CEFTA countries contributed 13.4% (€851.9 million) of imports, led by Albania (5.3%), North Macedonia (4.7%), and Serbia (2.0%). Imports from other countries, including Turkey (14.4%) and China (11.9%), made up 41.9% (€2.7 billion) of the total. The foreign trade shows a net deficit of €5,4 billion for 2024, which is increased for 7.4% compared to the same period of 2023.

== List of companies ==
=== Banks ===
Banks in Kosovo

Commercial banks operating in Kosovo marked their highest profit since their establishment. During 2011, the eight commercial banks operating in the country's financial markets have recorded together a profit of over 37 million Euros.

"ProCredit Bank" and "Raiffeisen Bank" marked the greater percentage from the total profit. The first recorded a profit of 16.8 million Euros, while the "Raiffeisen" has recorded a profit of over 12 million Euros. Compared with 2010, the commercial banks had around 5 million Euros more profit in 2011. The total net value of loans granted by commercial banks listed on 31 December 2011 amounted to 1.562 billion Euros. Meanwhile, in 2010, the net value of loans granted by commercial banks was 1.335 billion Euros. During 2011, lending increased by 227 million Euros. The value of deposits during 2011 has increased by 100 million Euros, reaching a total of 2.097 billion Euros. The United States and Kosovo in September 2012, signed a groundbreaking agricultural development credit scheme worth over €20 million. The program is to provide loan guarantees to six Kosovo banks to issue loans to farmers and agricultural businesses, increasing lending to a sector that is constrained by lack of access to credit.

Commercial banks of Kosovo

- Banka Ekonomike
- BKT Kosovë
- BPB Banka për Biznes
- LESNA nbfi
- NLB Bank
- ProCredit Bank Kosova
- Raiffeisen Bank Kosovo J.S.C.
- TEB Kosovo
- IŞBANK
- PriBank Sh.A.

=== Telecommunications ===
Kosovo has two Global System for Mobile Communications 900 MHz networks, Vala and IPKO. The prefix of those operators is +383. Telenor and Telekom Srbija (Serbian operators) used to have coverage in Pristina and some other little areas of Kosovo, but their towers have been dismantled in the independent territory, so that GSM coverage is now offered only by the two local operators. In 2009 the first mobile virtual network operator appeared in Kosovo. It's called D3 and uses IPKO's Slovenian network. The secondo MVNO, Z Mobile, uses Vala's network and Monaco prefix.

There are two virtual operators :

- D3 Mobile - 043 prefix
- Z Mobile - 045 prefix

GSM-services in Kosovo are provided by Vala, a subsidiary of PTK, and IPKO, a company owned by Slovenian Telecom, which has acquired the second mobile operator license in Kosovo and has started operations in late 2007. Vala has over 850.000 subscribers, mostly using the pre-paid system, whereas IPKO has gained over 300,000 subscribers within just a few months.

Market share

Based on the report of the TRA, VALA remains the leader in mobile telephony market in Kosovo, taking over 67% of the total, if included Z-mobile virtual operator, which uses the infrastructure VALA network.

Infrastructure	Network	Market share operator
VALA	VALA	67%
Z-Mobile (Virtual Operator)	Vala	4%
IPKO	IPKO	29%

Internet in Kosovo

KV - 2,350,000 population (2015) - territorial area: 10,908 km^{2}

Capital city: Pristina - population 500,000 (est.)

1,693,942 Internet users as of March 2021, 93.6% penetration, per GfK.

Facebook users, 1.000.000 (est.)

- IPKO
- Post and Telecom of Kosovo (PTK)
- Kujtesa

== See also ==
- Central Bank of Kosovo
- History of Kosovo
- List of banks in Kosovo
