= Information and communications technology in Kosovo =

Information and communication technology (ICT) in Kosovo has experienced a remarkable development since 1999. From being almost non-existent 10 years ago, Kosovar companies in the information technology (IT) domain offer today wide range of ICT services to their customers both local as well as to foreign companies. Kosovo has the youngest population in Europe, with advanced knowledge in ICT.

Today, public and private education institutions in the IT field, through certified learning curricula by companies such as CISCO and Microsoft, provide education to thousands of young Kosovars while the demand for this form of training is still rising.

Kosovo has two authorized mobile network operators and is the only country in the region not having awarded any UMTS license. Kosovo has neither awarded licenses for fixed wireless access, nor made the 900 and 1800 MHz bands technology neutral. Currently around 1,200,000 customers of "Vala" Post and Telecom of Kosovo (PTK). As of March 2007 the second GSM license granted to IPKO – Telekom Slovenije. Currently IPKO has over 1,000,000 users. Following the Brussels Agreement, Kosovo has its own telephone dialing code: +383. Before this assignment, network operators in Kosovo used either +377 (Monaco) or +386 (Slovenia). All other codes were to have been superseded by the new code on 15 January 2017, but some are still in use.

The infrastructure of ICT sector in Kosovo is mainly built of microwave network, optic and coaxial cable (DOCSIS). The telecom industry is liberalized and legislation is introduced adopting European Union regulatory principles and promoting competition. Some of the main internet providers are PTK, IPKO, Kujtesa and Artmotion.

== History ==
First ICT companies in Kosovo can be found as early 1984, these companies where mainly focused on radio telecommunication and audio-video systems, while in early and mid '90s more companies were created, mainly specializing in personal computer sales. ICT industry in Kosovo boomed after 1999 with a lot of new companies being created, among which IPKO which now one of the major telecommunication providers and one of the biggest foreign investments in Kosovo.

== Telecommunications ==
Post and Telecom of Kosovo
- Type: Joint stock company
- Industry: Communications Services
- Founded: 1965
- Headquarters: Pristina, Kosovo
- Key people: Ejup Qerimi, CEO
- Products: Fixed telephony Mobile telephony xDSLs; Postal Services

iPKO Telecommunications, L.L.C
- Type: limited liability company
- Industry: Communications Services
- Founded: 1999
- Headquarters: Pristina, Kosovo
- Key people: Robert Erzin, CEO
- Products: Fixed telephony Mobile telephony Cable Internet; DTV

Dukagjini Telecommunications - D3 Mobile, L.L.C
- Type: limited liability company
- Industry: Communications Services
- Founded: 2008
- Headquarters: Pristina, Kosovo
- Key people: Kujtim Gacaferri, CEO
- Products: Mobile telephony - MVNO

Dardaphone - Z-Mobile
- Type: limited liability company
- Industry: Communications Services
- Founded: 2010
- Headquarters: Pristina, Kosovo
- Key people: Milot Gjkolli, CEO
- Products: Mobile telephony - MVNO

Kujtesa Net
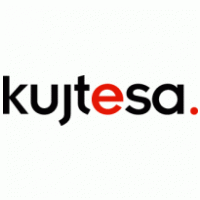
- Type: limited liability company
- Industry: Communications Services
- Founded: 1995
- Headquarters: Pristina, Kosovo
- Key people: Arbër Arifi, CEO
- Products: Cable Internet; DTV

According to Regulatory Authority of Electronics and Postal Communication 2011 report, 86 telecommunication licenses have been issued since 2004.

Licenses	Number
Internet Service Providers	38
Value-Added Services	29
International Telecommunication Services	6
International Telecommunication Peering	6
Fixed Telephony Services	3
Mobile Telephony Services - GSM	2
MVNO (Mobile Virtual Network Operator)	2

=== Mobile Telephony ===
In 2010, 74 percent of the population was subscribed to mobile phone services, or a total number of 1,537,164 In 2007, PTK reported growth of subscribers from 300,000 to 800,000 in less than a year. In 2006, the number was 562,000.

You are required to show your ID to get a Sim card and pre-paid can be bought for 5 euros. There are many shops selling used mobile phones and sim unlocking services.

Two licensed Mobile network operators offer their services in competition with two MVNOs. The market, however, remains concentrated with the incumbent's mobile subsidiary controlling over 65% of the market. Mobile broadband services are not available as no UMTS licenses have been awarded. So far, there are no plans to carry out the re-farming of 900/1800 MHz bands or assign frequency spectrum for mobile broadband.

Name	Date	Type	Validity
PTK SH.a/Vala (+377 Monaco prefix) 3G and 4G LTE	30/07/2004	GSM 900/1800 MHz	15 Years
IPKO Telecommunications LLC (+386 Slovenia prefix) 3G active	06/03/2007	GSM 900/1800 MHz	15 Years
Dukagjini Telecommunications sh.a. (D3 Mobile)	24/06/2008	MVNO	15 Years
Dardaphone.net LLC (Z Mobile)	12/06/2008	MVNO	15 Years

GSM-services in Kosovo are provided currently by Vala, a subsidiary of PTK, and IPKO, a company owned by Telekom Slovenije, which has acquired the second mobile operator license in Kosovo and has started operations in late 2007. Vala has over 850,000 subscribers, mostly using the pre-paid system, whereas IPKO has gained over 300,000 subscribers within just a few months.

There are three virtual operators :

- D3 Mobile (virtual operator)-043 prefix
- Z Mobile (virtual operator)-045 prefix
- Zog Mobile (Powered by IPKO)-043 prefix

=== Fixed Telephony ===
Fixed telephony penetration rate is among the lowest in Europe about 5 lines per 100 inhabitants in 2011, in contrast with neighboring countries and European Union countries where penetration rates are 25% and 40% respectfully.

There are currently three licensed Fixed Telephony providers in Kosovo:

- PTK
- IPKO
- KONET (leased lines)

PTK is by far the leading provider with market share of 94.4%, IPKO has only 5.6%. Number of subscribers dropped in 2011 to 86,014 from 88,372 in 2010, marking a drop of 2,358 or 2.67% of subscriber base.

=== Dialing Code ===
After the breakup of Yugoslavia, with dialing code 38, Kosovo used the Serbian dialing code, 381 for new and existing landlines. As mobile networks were introduced, PTK adopted the code 377 (Monaco) and IPKO adopted the code 386 (Slovenia). This situation resulted in the highly unusual simultaneous use of three international dialing codes.

In September 2012 the Assembly of Kosovo approved a resolution on replacing the various dialing codes in use with the Albanian country code 355. While this initiative draw a lot of media attention, it never saw the light of day.

In January 2016 after ongoing political discussions between Kosovo and Serbia, it was agreed that Kosovo would get its own country code: 383. This code is available for all mobile and fixed-line operators, all of whom were using other international telecom country code. The code 383 has now been formally assigned, and is in the process of adoption. This code was to have replaced all former codes on 15 January 2017, but the transition has yet to be complete.

=== Internet ===
Total of 38 licensed companies provide internet services in Kosovo, 6 of them with direct peering towards international gateways. Number of technologies are used to provide internet to end users, most popular being the cable DOCSIS technology with 68.95% of the market, followed by 25.43% xDSL and 5.62% other technologies like FTTX and wireless.

Technology	%
Cable/DOCSIS	68.95%
xDSL	25.43%
Wireless	4.57%
FTTx	0.64%
Other	0.41%

In contrast with other countries, majority of market share is owned by private operators, with a total of 74.57%. The biggest operator being IPKO with 51.21% followed by Kujtesa with 19.08% and PTK with 25.43%.

Operator	Technology	Users	(%)
IPKO	DOCSIS	73,354	51.21%
PTK	xDSL	36,432	25.43%
Kujtesa	DOCSIS	27,331	19.08%

Others include:

- Artmotion
- ArdiNet
- OrangeNet
- I.T.S.
- ComNet
- NegeNet
- Telekom Srbija

=== Internet Penetration ===
Internet penetration in Kosovo is 96%. Laptops are the most frequent device found in almost half of the Kosovo households (48%), followed by a computer (39%). On average, households in Kosovo have a 20 Mbps download and 6 upload internet speed.

Vast majority of the Kosovo population (81%) use the internet every day, and the internet is used by the absolute majority (96%) of the Kosovo population at least at some occasion. In addition, the internet usage is almost equally distributed across majority of age groups and is mostly used by students and employed people.

Internet is used three and a half hours daily on average by the Kosovo citizens. Incomparably, mobile phones are the most frequent device (73%) used to access the internet.

A very important discovery of the research is that 93% of Kosovo citizens use the internet for communication. All other reasons of usage are drastically lower compared to the communication. Consequently, as well as related to the reasons why the internet is used mostly in terms of applications and webpages visited, communication platforms are used the most.

The vast majority of Kosovo citizens (98%) possess a mobile phone, and close to half of them (43%) possesses internet subscription on their phone.

=== Digital Television ===
Digital television transition is still an ongoing process in Kosovo, limiting the analog television broadcast domain to only three national channels. Due to this conditions all four major telecommunications companies in Kosovo now broadcast digital TV on other mediums. While IPKO and Kujtesa have chosen to reuse the existing coaxial network, PTK which offers xDSL services went for IPTV, Artomotion offers digital TV to selected users in Pristina. IPKO has recently launched an IPTV solution, tailored towards mobile customers. Currently platform is available in iOS, Android and via a web browser.

=== Metro WiFi ===
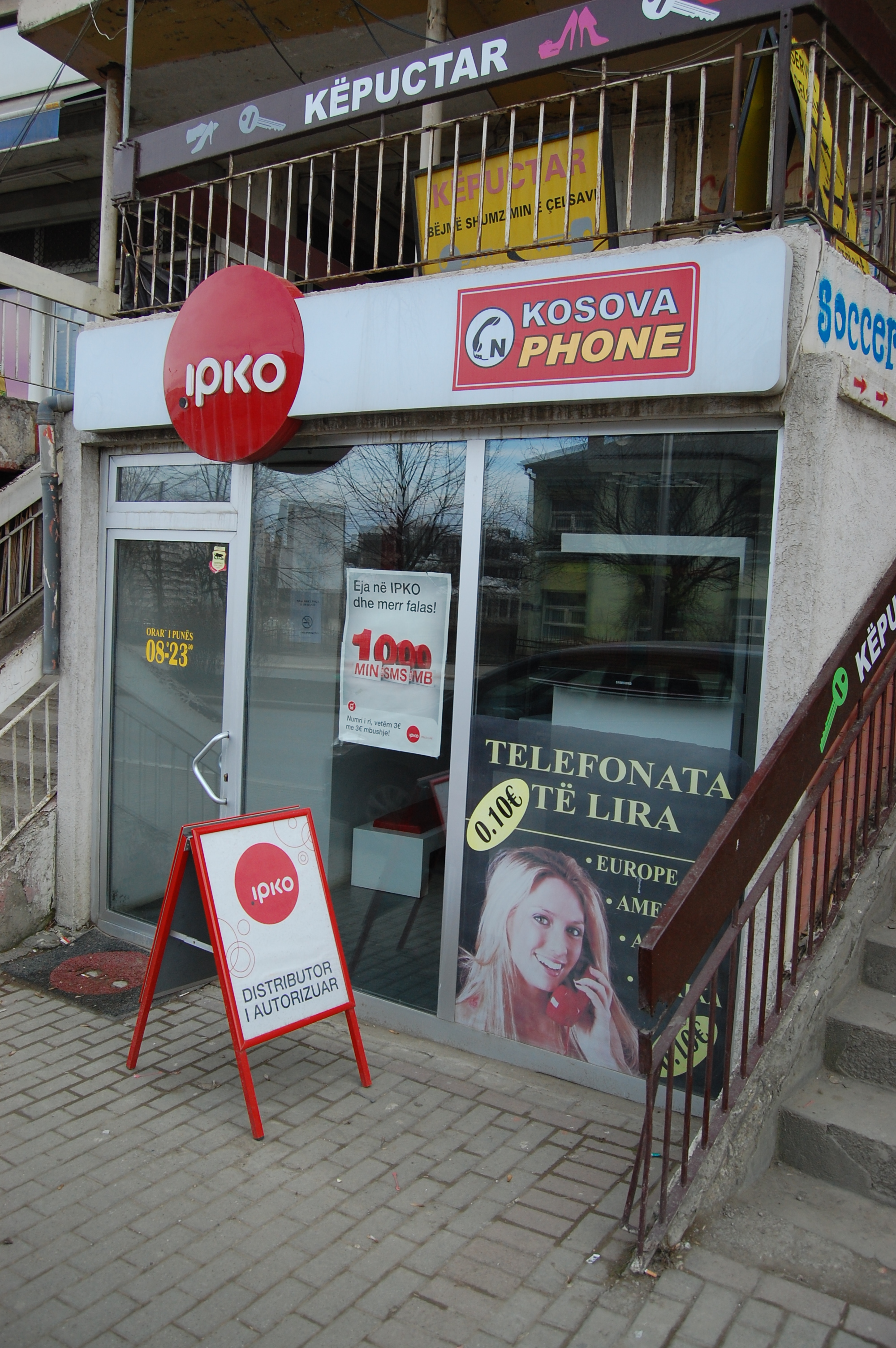
IPKO phone shop in Pristina (February 2013)

Due to missing 3G/LTE licenses in Kosovo, and a growing demand for mobile broadband services from subscribers, both telecommunication providers PTK and IPKO turned to Municipal wireless network (Muni Wi-Fi). Both operators cover the majority of cities around Kosovo and touristic destinations like Prekaz and Brezovica, with more cities to be covered later.

=== Kosovo Internet Exchange Point ===
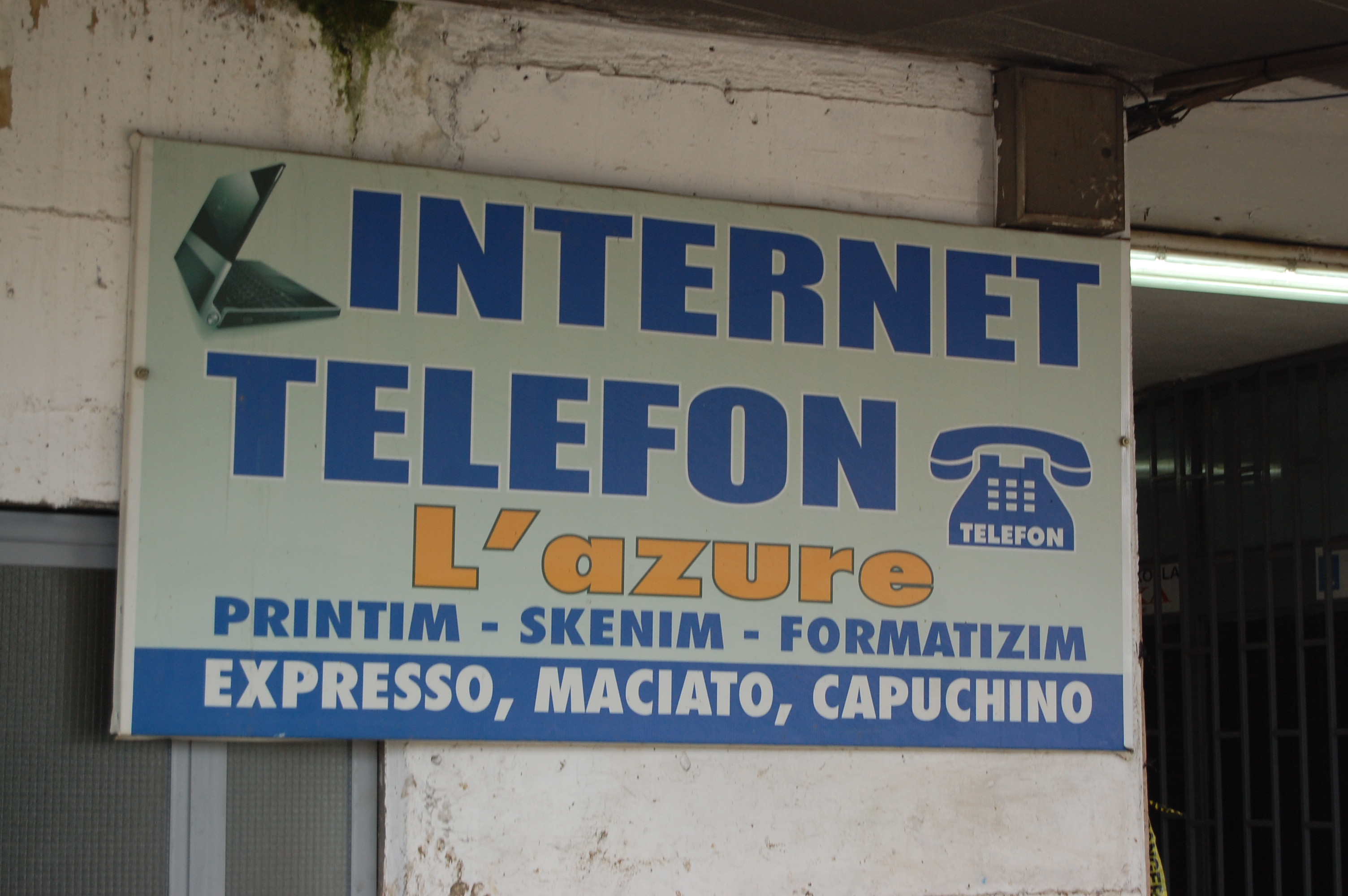
Internet & telephone shop signage in Pristina (February 2013)

The Internet Exchange Point (KOSIX), the first of its kind in Kosovo, started operating on 23 June 2011, and it operates as a functional unit within Telecommunications Regulatory Authority (TRA). Its function is to provide the ISPs operating in Kosovo, an Internet exchange point for local traffic exchange. Valuable and continuous contributions for the implementation of this project have given: United States Agency for International Development (USAID) offered throughout their program Kosovo Private Enterprise Program, Norwegian government offered through Ministry of Foreign Affairs and Norwegian embassy respectively, Cisco Systems International BV, and University of Prishtina which have offered adequate space within the buildings of Electrical and Computer Engineering Faculty.

Currently four national ISPs are interconnected via KOSIX, there is no cost for peering.

ISP Name	AS Number
PTK	AS8661
IPKO	AS21246
KUJTESA	AS29170
ARTMOTION	AS33983
TELKOS	AS206262

== Economical aspects ==
ICT in Kosovo consists of relatively young companies (most of them incorporated after 1999) and with predominantly small companies with less than 20 employees. 53.8 percent of ICT companies are individual business while limited Liability Company (28.6 percent). Businesses specializing in maintenance and manufacturing are purely individual, while other sub-sectors are served by a mix of individual and LLC businesses. Other forms of incorporation are rare, with 4.4 percent being Limited Partnership, and 2.2 percent Joint-Stock Company. The rest (5.5) are either public companies or have the unusual status of NGOs. Currently, the ICT companies are determined to grow and prosper within the Kosovo market, while very few companies seek expansion in markets outside Kosovo.

According to TRA report, ICT industry generated €239,518,037.36, 83.19 of which is generated by Mobile network operator, 8.37% from Fix telephony operators, 7.77% from Internet service providers and 0.68% from leased lines.

=== Market ===
The structure of the ICT market in Kosovo is diverse in the variety of activities, sales being the main activity 62 percent of the ICT companies have reported to import goods for retail, meanwhile their exports are minimal and their market share growth is seen to be within Kosovo, and could reach as far as North Macedonia and Albania. The average annual turnover in the sector is 250,000 euros, with an increasing number of companies reporting turnovers in millions of euros.

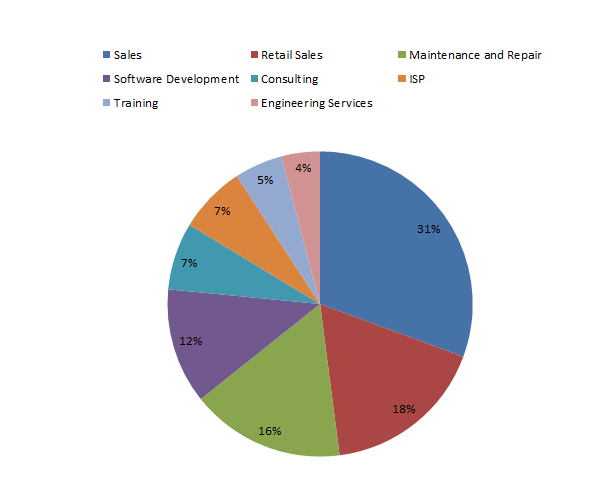
The structure of the ICT market in Kosovo

- Sales - 33%
- Retail Sales - 18.7%
- Maintenance and Repair - 17.6%
- Software Development - 13.2%
- Consulting - 7.7
- ISP - 7.7%
- Training - 5.5%
- Engineering Services - 4.4%

=== Ownership ===
The ICT sector is dominated by domestic firms. According to the survey, 80.2 percent of the respondents represented companies that are 100% domestically owned. Only 6.6 percent of the companies are entirely owned by foreigners. Mixed ownership is rare (3.3 percent). The other 3.3 percent that answered "Other" were either mostly owned by foreign companies or public/state-owned companies. Foreign investors are mostly present in the sub-sectors: consulting, information services, vendors, manufacturing/assembling, and retail.

=== Size and Employment ===
The majority of ICT companies is small. More than three-quarters (77.1 percent) employ from one to twenty employees. Only a handful of the companies have more than 100 employees. Most of the employees working in the ICT sector are male, leaving the female employees in a tiny minority. Around 19 percent of the companies do not have any female employees at all. Over 93 per cent employ up to 10 women, 6 per cent of the firms employ between 11 and 20, and only 1.4 percent up to 30. There is one large company which employs 230 female workers.

=== Average Salary ===
This list is a result of a survey conducted by USAID, Kosovo Private Enterprise Program with 829 ICT companies.

Job Title	Number of employees	(%)	Average Salary
Telecomm. Network Engineers	123	14.8%	450
Software and Application Programmers	76	9.2%	487
ICT Project Managers	65	7.8%	507
ICT Managers	48	5.8%	641
Web Designers and Developers	42	5.1%	550
Hardware Technicians	42	5.1%	406
ICT Trainers	41	4.9%	450
ICT Sales Representatives	39	4.7%	316
Electrical Engineers	32	3.9%	500
Database Developers	27	3.3%	No Answer
ICT Business Development Managers	22	2.7%	683
ICT Account Manager	21	2.5%	550
Database Administrators	20	2.4%	No Answer
Telecommunications Technicians	18	2.2%	350
ICT and Telecomm. Technicians	18	2.2%	230
ICT Professionals (vendor certifications)	17	2.1%	600
Network Administrators	16	1.9%	500
Telecommunications Field Engineers	15	1.8%	No Answer
Web Administrators	14	1.7%	No Answer
Systems Administrators	13	1.6%	950
Telecommunications Engineers	12	1.4%	600
Network Analysts and Network Designers	11	1.3%	450
Multimedia Designers	11	1.3%	No Answer
Electronic Equipment Trades Workers	11	1.3%	400
Telecommunications Cable Technicians	10	1.2%	No Answer
ICT Business Analysts	10	1.2%	No Answer
Radio communications Technicians	9	1.1%	230
ICT Network and Support Professionals	8	1.0%	No Answer
ICT Systems Test Engineers	7	0.8%	No Answer
Telecommunications Trade Workers	6	0.7%	No Answer
Systems Analysts	6	0.7%	No Answer
ICT Support Technicians	6	0.7%	300
ICT Quality Assurance Engineers	6	0.7%	325
ICT Security Specialists	4	0.5%	No Answer
ICT Customer Support Officers	4	0.4%	No Answer

=== Kosovo Association of information and technology (STIKK) ===
According to statute, STIKK is a non-profit association founded and registered in accordance with the Law on Freedom of Association and Non-Governmental Organization. STIKK represents the interests of the information and communications technology of Kosova, and the interests of professionals in ITC industry.

== Educational aspects ==
The increasing number of vacancies for ICT professionals in Kosovo is reflecting the increasing progress of the industry, although thanks to the high quality of the university education of IT specialists, and the increasing interest of young people in modern technologies, there are no signs of systematic shortages in ICT employment, except a registered under-supply of specialists in the field of software development and programming. The number of ICT graduates grows each year and the leader in providing the needed skills to the industry is the Faculty of Electrical and Computer Engineering of the University of Pristina. ICT skilled professionals are also supplied by the University for Business and Technology, the American University in Kosovo, as well as a few vocational education providers.

According to the Kosovo Accreditation Agency there are currently 13 higher education institutions, public and private, accredited to offer ICT related study programs in their curricula.

=== The State University of Pristina ===
- Faculty of Electrical and Computer Engineering,
- Faculty of Natural Sciences, Department of Computer Science,
- Faculty of Applied Technical Sciences, Mitrovica.

=== The State University of Prizren ===
- Faculty of Computer Science.

=== Private Universities ===
- American University in Kosovo - has since 2003 an Information Technology program in bachelor studies,
- University for Business and Technology - has an ICT related program both in bachelor and master studies.

AAB College AAB College is the first non-public institution of higher education in Kosovo

=== Private Colleges ===
- AAB Riinvest - has an ICT related program - Software Engineering in bachelor studies, and also the same one in the master studies. In June 2026, the Faculty of Foreign Languages signed a cooperation agreement with Kosovo-based business process outsourcing company OLYMP BPO L.L.C., covering student internships, career development, training sessions, lectures and workshops.
- European College Dukagjini - has two bachelor programs related to ICT as of 2011: Management and Informatics, and Applied Informatics.
- College Iliria - has two programs related to ICT: Management and Informatics, and Applied Informatics. Even though they have few master programs, none of them is related to ICT.
- Vizioni Per Arsim has a bachelor program related to ICT:– Computer Science.

=== Other ===
- CACTTUS Education - since 2016 has a number of programs in systems and software engineering offering two year professional vocational Education in ICT
- Professional training centers and academies (Cisco, Microsoft, ECDL, Oracle, RedHat etc.)
- Universities abroad.

== Legislation ==
For a short period Kosovo has managed to adopt few very important pieces of legislation and a strategic framework to support the government’s efforts to regulate, promote and improve the development of the ICT sector in Kosovo. Some of the most important legislative acts that have influenced the progress of the sector are:

=== Laws ===
- Telecommunications law. – Adopted in 2002, the law governs all telecommunications services and all telecommunications service providers in Kosovo. The main objective of the Telecommunications law is to create a transparent legal and regulatory environment for the promotion of more investments in the sector and encourage competition.
- Law on Information Society Services. – Approved in 2005 with the aim of enabling the legal use of electronic documentation, and facilitate the implementation of e-commerce, e-signature and personal data protection.
- Law on Administrative Procedure – created to control the electronic implementation of the activities of public administration.
- Law on Copyright and Related Rights.
- Law on Scientific Research Activity.
- Law on the Protection of Personal Data.
- Law on Prevention and Fight against Cyber Crime.
- Law for Privacy and Database Access.
- Law on Digital Signatures
- Postal Services Law

=== Strategic Framework ===
- eSEE Agenda Plus for the Development of Information Society in SEE 2007-2012 - Kosovo is an active member of the regional eSEE Initiative - (Electronic South East Europe). The main objective of the initiative is to integrate SEE countries into the global, knowledge-based economy through development of the Information Society, in line with the European Union i2010 framework.
- National Strategy for Information Society 2006-2012 – The Strategy was adopted by the Government of Kosovo in 2006.
- Electronic Governance Strategy 2009-2015 – Published by the Department of Information Technology of the Ministry of Public Services of Kosovo in 2008, ensuring the provision of governmental institutions’ services through information technology and communication (WAN, Internet, mobile network) to citizens, businesses and others.
- E-learning Strategy for Kosovo 2011 - 2015 – Prepared by the Ministry of Education, Science and Technology with the main objective to transform e-learning into an integral part of the overall national educational system.
- Strategy for Development of Pre-university Education 2007–2017 – Adopted by the Ministry of Education, Science and Technology and used as a basis for the development of the education system of Kosovo.
- Kosovo Education Strategic Plan 2011-2016 – Drafted in September 2010, the Strategic Plan is going to include eight priority programs among which are Capacity Building and Information and Communication Technology. The objective implemented in the ICT program is to fully develop and integrate ICT infrastructure and technical support needed to implement and sustain good educational practices.

=== Agencies ===
==== Regulatory Authority of Electronics and Postal Communication ====
Law on Telecommunications adopted by the Assembly and promulgated by UNMIK, Regulation 2003/16, recognizes the need to improve the telecommunications sector of Kosovo, by establishing an independent regulatory agency responsible for licensing and supervising the providers of telecommunications services in Kosovo, encouraging the private sector participation and competition in the provision of services; setting standards for all service providers in Kosovo, and, establishing provisions for consumer protection. TRA officially started operating in January 2004. During its young development TRA went through some important milestones that represented a very important step towards a free, competitive market which promotes the development of the information society in Kosova.

== Digital Divide ==
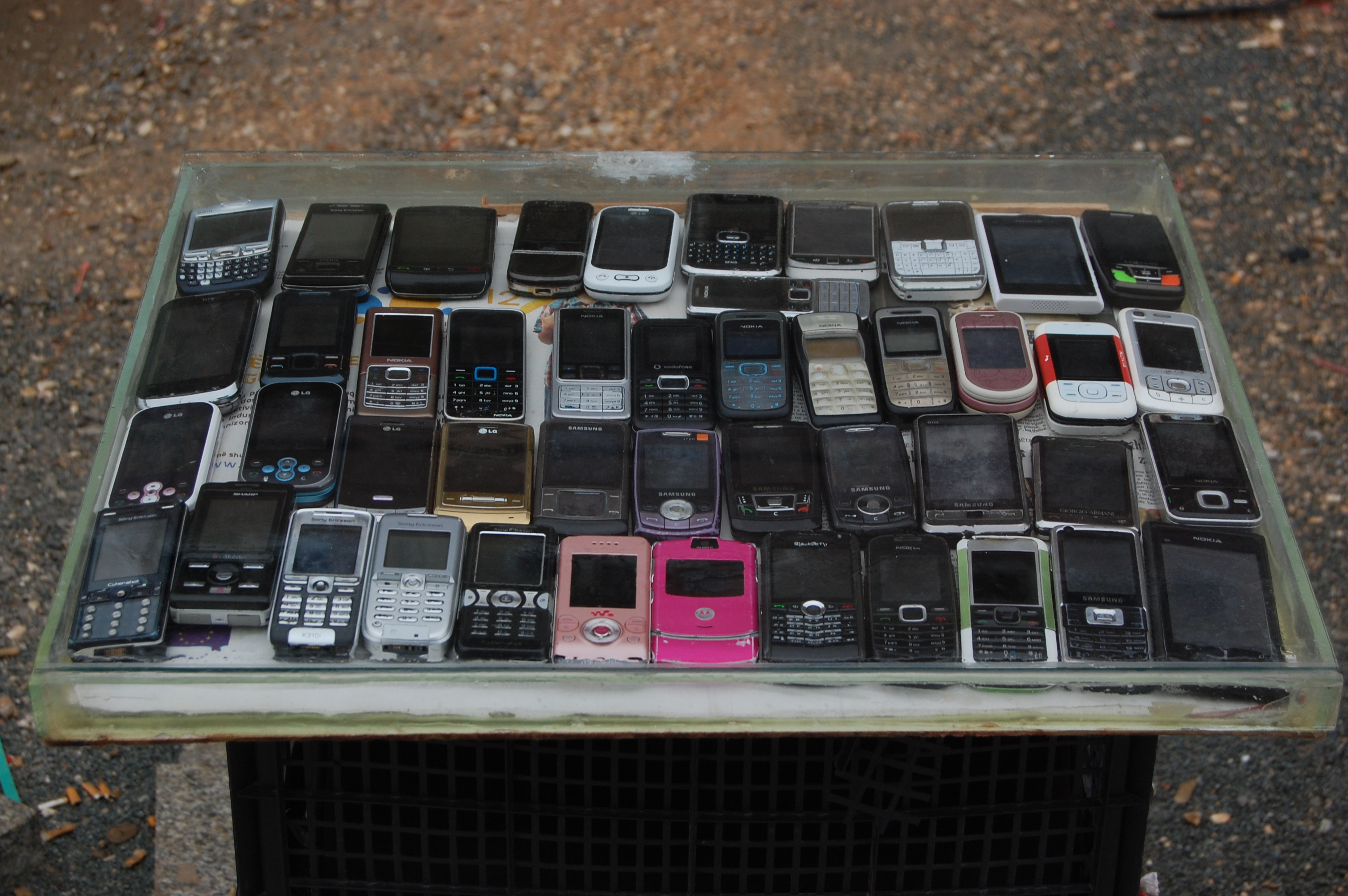
Second-hand mobile phones for sale at a roadside stall in Pristina in 2013

=== Age ===
Due to the overly young population in Kosovo, digital divide is not very notable, this phenomenon is more notable with people in their fifties and above. This problem was evident with the educational system as well, to address this Government of Kosovo organized an ECDL course for about 27000 teachers across Kosovo.

=== Gender ===
The labor force in the ICT sector is dominated by men with women comprising a marginal portion (although more significant in larger companies).

=== Location ===
Most ICT firms are based in the Pristina, the economic, political, and social center of the country, where most businesses are located and where there is the highest concentration of customers, as much as 81 percent of all ICT companies have Prishtina as their head office location. The rest are fairly evenly spread out in the regional centers: Peja, Prizren, Gjilan, Gjakova, Podujeva, and Ferizaj.

== Open source ==
Over the years there have been a number of open source organizations including Albanian Linux user group (AlbaLinux). Due to lack of support, most of them are now "passive"; among the most active and successful open source groups is Free Libre Open Source Software Kosova (FLOSSK).

- Free Libre Open Source Software Kosova (FLOSSK)

FLOSSK began in March 2009 at the initiative of James Michael DuPont as a result of the desire to organize a conference on free and open software. After six difficult months and with the help of many supporters, FLOSSK organized the first conference of free and open software in Kosovo in August 2009. Apart from the conference, FLOSSK continued to work in various activities such as organizing Software Freedom Days in different cities of Kosovo, lectures on free software throughout Kosovo, translating software, collaborating with the media to promote free software and creating local free software groups in various cities. From the beginning, FLOSSK members and the general public learned about Linux operating system, FLOSS programs for solving everyday problems, map creation using OpenStreetMap, and met free software movement figures from around the world.

- Software Freedom Kosova

Software Freedom Kosova Conference is an annual conference on free and open source software and related developments in knowledge, culture and mapping held in Pristina, Kosovo. It is the largest conference of its kind in the region. The conference is organised by Free/Libre Open Source Software Kosova (FLOSSK), Kosovo Association of Information and Communication Technology, Ipko Foundation and Faculty of Electrical and Computer Engineering of the University of Prishtina.

== Outsourcing ==
A case study on ICT training in Kosovo performed by CISCO Networking Academy (NetAcad) states that the educated and experienced workforce as a whole is searching higher salaries and better working conditions abroad. If graduates are not experienced, they stay for a while in Kosovo and when they have gained experience they start searching opportunities for migration.

A NetAcad case study revealed that Kosovo was a well-suited ICT outsourcing country, and the time difference with the USA made it appealing for the U.S. market. 3CIS provides highly specialized services to major telecommunication carriers across the globe. This includes network architecture design, planning, consulting, implementation, integration, and testing with an emphasis on mobile back-hauling. 3CIS also provides on-site consulting ser- vices as well as manages and coordinates the activities in a multi-vendor environment during the life-cycle of the complete project. 3CIS also offers project management services that are tailored to suit client needs from initial planning to project completions.

Kosovo has made it to other markets as well, both individually as well as established companies. Sprigs is the most prominent example of a Kosovar start-up company established in Pristina. Anoniem is the highest-profile job to date for SPRIGS, which was founded in late 2010, by a Dutch entrepreneur, and this job was trusted to a half-dozen young Kosovar Albanian programmers, who work at computers at a repurposed apartment that now houses the technical brain trust of this IT outsourcing company.

== See also ==
- Economy of Kosovo
- Education in Kosovo
- American University in Kosovo
- Universiteti i Prishtinës
- University of Prizren
- Media of Kosovo
- Telecommunications in Albania
