= Artmotion (Kosovo) =

Kosovan internet and cable television service provider

Artmotion SH.P.K.
- Type: Private
- Industry: Telecommunications; Media
- Genre: OTT platform
- Founded: 2001; 25 years ago (as IT operator); 2004; 22 years ago (as internet service provider)
- Headquarters: Pristina, Kosovo
- Area served: Kosovo
- Key people: Kushtrim Gojani (CEO)
- Products: Telecommunications services
- Services: Internet service Cable television
- Owner: Kushtrim Gojani (KGO Media Investments Holding)
- Parent: Devolli Corporation
- Website: artmotion.net

Artmotion SH.P.K. is a Kosovan technology company providing internet service and cable television, as well as media services producing original TV programming and distributing licensed content. It offers television via IPTV and OTT platforms. The company was founded in 2001, originally only serving Pristina and expanding coverage in the late 2010s to all of Kosovo. It became a subsidiary of the conglomerate Devolli Corporation in the late 2010s.

Artmotion is one of the dominant cable and internet service providers in Kosovo, competing with IPKO, Kujtesa, and TelKos.

== History ==
Artmotion was founded in 2001 as an information technology services company and began providing internet services in the Pristina region in 2003. In 2008, it expanded operations across Kosovo, and in 2011 it launched cable television services. The Independent Media Commission licensed Artmotion as a cable operator in 2013, expanding coverage to Ferizaj, Rahovec, Istog, Viti, and Shtime.

Around 2017, Artmotion became a subsidiary of the Kosovan conglomerate Devolli Corporation, joining brands like Comodita Home and Prince Caffe. Following a rebranding in 2018, Artmotion became a cable TV platform with its own channels.

In 2022, Artmotion announced a partnership with the Albanian media company DigitAlb to bring its channels, including Top Channel, to Kosovo, following DigitAlb's termination of its contract with IPKO.

Artmotion also produces the reality show Big Brother VIP Kosova in collaboration with Banijay.

In 2024, the Competition Authority of Kosovo (AKRK) launched an investigation on Artmotion and its competitor Kujtesa due to a suspected unlawful trade deal between the two, which Buletini Ekonomik has called "hidden cartel dealing".

== Exclusive channels ==
Since 2018, Artmotion broadcasts its own channels targeting different age groups and interests. These include three Kino channels for films, two Doku channels for documentaries on world and nature topics, six sports channels under the ArtSport brand with commentary in Albanian, Prime with entertainment programming in Albanian and English, Episode for English-language series and reality shows, Prince Kids for children and teens, and the music channel Beat TV.

On 24 December 2018, Artmotion launched a cooking channel, Gurmania Channel.

During Big Brother VIP Kosova seasons, two 24-hour channels are dedicated to following contestants – Big Brother VIP Kosova 1 and Big Brother VIP Kosova 2.

== Sports coverage ==
In 2018, the company began broadcasting domestic basketball from the Kosovo Basketball Superleague, First League, women's league, youth leagues, and the national team. Later, the platform added rally racing, Argentine football, DFB-Pokal, as well as competitions in handball, volleyball, athletics, and swimming.

Subsequent months included Formula One and MotoGP, judo, and kickboxing with Enfusion and One Championship, and later broadcasting rights for the NBA and the ABA League. Artmotion also acquired rights for the UEFA Champions League, Europa League, and Conference League starting from the 2021/22 season.

The 2020/21 season began with Kosovo Football Superleague coverage, first broadcasting Trepça - Arbëria. In October, the platform added Bundesliga and later entered esports with Counter-Strike: Global Offensive. By summer 2021, Artmotion acquired rights to La Liga and Ligue 1, and via Arena Sport channels, also Serie A.

=== Sports commentators ===
Regular commentators include:

- Agon Fehmiu
- Arlind Sadiku
- Andi Shabani
- Arbon Flugaj
- Engjëll Bërbatovci
- Emanuell Syla
- Lirim Peci
- Naim Selmani
- Ulpiana Emra
- Valon Krasniqi

== See also ==
- Klan Kosova
