= List of banks in Kosovo =

This is a list of banks operating in Kosovo.

== Central banks ==
Name	Established	Governor	Origin	Website
Central Bank of Kosovo	27 July 2008	Ahmet Ismaili	(Kosovo)	Central Bank of Kosovo

== Commercial banks ==
The banks operate in the official currency of Kosovo, the Euro.

Name	Origin	Website
PriBank Sh.A.	(Kosovo)	pribank-ks.com
Banka Ekonomike	(Kosovo)	bekonomike.com
Banka Kombëtare Tregtare	(Albania)	bkt-ks.com
Banka për Biznes	(Kosovo)	bpbbank.com
NLB Banka	(Slovenia)	nlb-kos.com
ProCredit Bank	(Germany)	procreditbank-kos.com
Raiffeisen Bank Kosovo	(Austria)	raiffeisen-kosovo.com
TEB SH.A.	(Turkey)	teb-kos.com
Ziraat Bank	(Turkey)	ziraatbank-kosova.com
Turkiye Is Bank	(Turkey)	isbankkosova.com

== Banks operating in the Serb-populated regions of Kosovo ==
The majority of Serbian banks previously licensed by the National Bank of Serbia to operate in Kosovo have been shut down. These banks previously operated in the official currency of Serbia, the Serbian dinar. Komercijalna Banka ad Beograd is now licensed through the Central Bank of Kosovo. In December 2023, it was confirmed that starting from February 2024, Komercijalna Banka will close its branches in Kosovo.

== Disbanded banks ==
Name	Capital	Website
American Bank of Kosovo	(United States)	Disbanded

== See also ==
- Banking in Kosovo
- List of banks in the euro area
- List of banks in Europe
- List of banks in Yugoslavia
