= Crime in Kosovo =

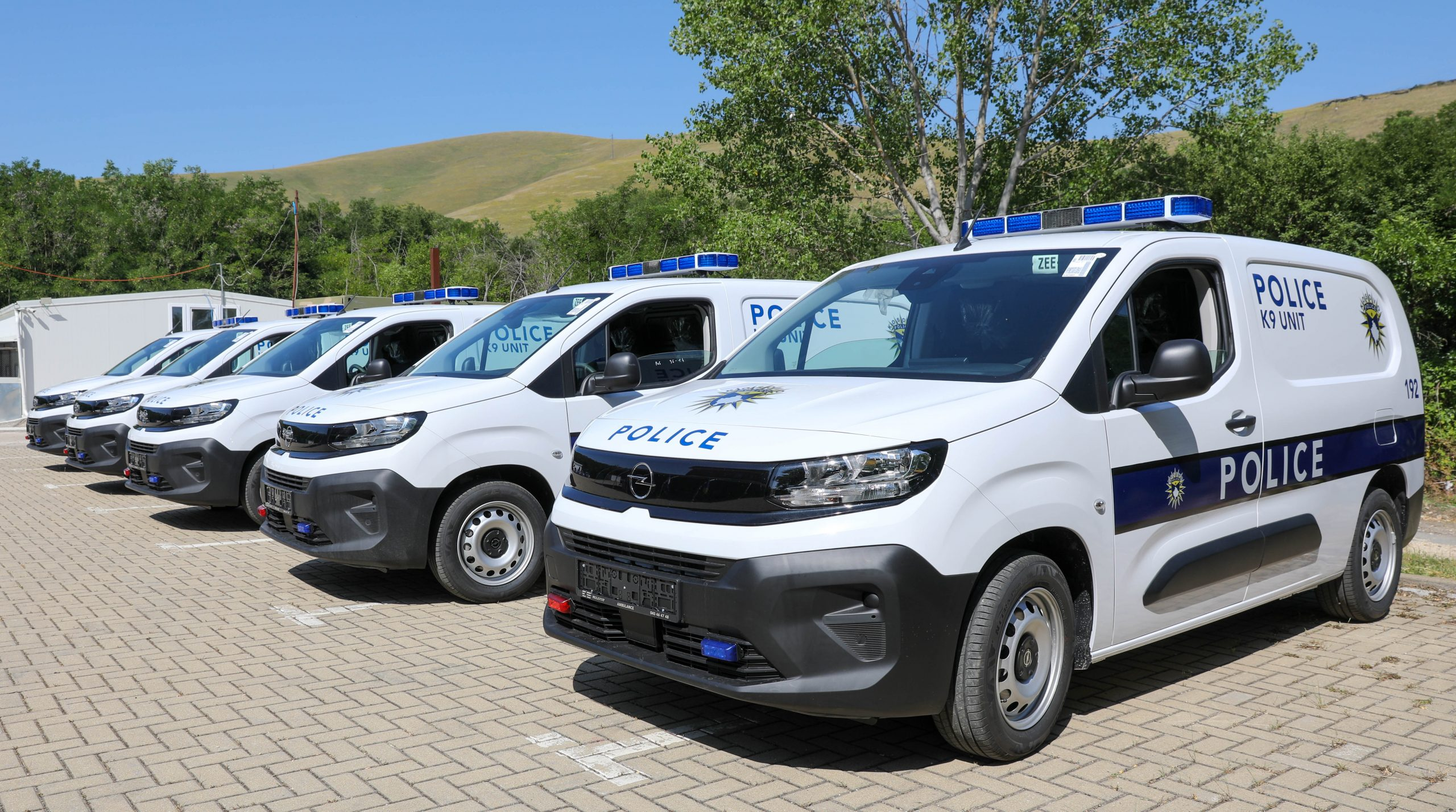
Police K9 vehicles in Kosovo

Kosovo within communist Yugoslavia had the lowest rate of crime in the whole country. Following the Kosovo War (1999), the region had become a significant center of organized crime, drug trafficking, human trafficking and organ theft. There is also an ongoing ethnic conflict between Kosovar Albanians and Kosovan Serbs. The large Kosovar diaspora which had built up in Western Europe during the 1990s, combined with the political instability, created ideal conditions for Kosovo to become "Europe's crime hub"; well into the 2000s, Kosovo remained associated with both ethnic conflict and organized crime. A Kosovo Police service has been built up under UN administration, beginning in 1999. It had an operational force of 7,000 officers in 2004, and further expanded to 9,000 by 2010. The deplorable crime rate led to an additional deployment of civilian law enforcement resources of the European Union to Kosovo, under the name of European Union Rule of Law Mission in Kosovo in 2008. Originally scheduled for two years, the duration of the deployment was extended twice, as of September 2012 scheduled to last until 2014.

According to the "Kosovo 2012 Crime and Safety Report" by the US Department of State (intended as an advisory to US nationals travelling abroad),

"High unemployment and other economic factors encourage criminal activity in Kosovo. Kosovo is rated as HIGH for residential and non-residential crime. Street crimes consisting of theft and purse snatchings are serious problems in Kosovo, especially in Pristina. Criminals often commit crimes while armed with handguns, as weapons are fairly easy to obtain."

== Registered crime rate ==
The number of reported murders rose 80% from 136 in 2000 to 245 in 2001. The number of reported arsons rose 140% from 218 to 523 over the same period. The number of noted serious crimes increased between 1999 and 2000. During the 2000s, it has been "starting to resemble the same patterns of other European cities".

UNMIK pointed out that the rise in reported incidents might simply correspond to an increased confidence in the police force (i.e., more reports) rather than more actual crime. According to the UNODC, by 2008, murder rates in Kosovo had dropped by 75% in five years.

Residual landmines and other unexploded ordnance remain in Kosovo, although all roads and tracks have been cleared. Caution when travelling in remote areas is advisable.

== Organized crime ==
Even though stabilization started later, in Kosovo, statistics are able to show that violent and organised crime in Kosovo is in a steady decline. According to Council of Europe Organised Crime Situation Report, 82% of all the organised crime investigations in Kosovo, up until 2005, involved trafficking in human beings. The other major 15% were investigations on extortion.

In 2005 the U.N Drug report has stated that organised crime in Kosovo controlled the heroin market in the region. The 2007 report identified them as new developers of the importation and distribution of South American cocaine within the region.

There are several institutions that are battling organized crime including EULEX, KFOR, and Kosovo Police. Currently, the main organised crime activity operates in north Kosovo.

== Drug crime ==
=== Drug trafficking ===
Kosovo is extremely vulnerable to organised crime and thus to money laundering. In 2000, international agencies estimated that the Kosovo drug mafia was supplying up to 40% of the heroin sold in Europe and North America. Due to the 1997 unrest in Albania and the Kosovo War in 1998–1999 ethnic Albanian traffickers enjoyed a competitive advantage, which has been eroding as the region stabilises. According to a 2008 report by the United Nations Office on Drugs and Crime, overall, ethnic Albanians, not only from Kosovo, supply 10 to 20% of the heroin in Western Europe, and the traffic has been declining.

From 2001 to 2007, there were 175.84 kg of Heroin seized, 17.34 kg of Cocaine seized and a total of 286.89 kg of Cannabis seized. Out of the three main smuggling paths for Europe, Kosovo is in only one of the chains. It acts as one of the transit countries between Afghanistan and Italy.

=== Heroin seizures ===
Increasing amounts of heroin smuggled are retained in Kosovo for use by local clients. The year 2007 marked a slight increase in the street price of heroin (from EUR 21 to EUR 25 per 1 gram), but the price remained the same, with no increase, in 2008. The typical purity level of street heroin is about 1%. The table below shows seizures of Heroin from 2007 to 2010.

Description of activities	2007	2008	2009	2010
Number of seizures	72	66	77	84
Seized quantities, in kg	47	44	36	55
Persons arrested	110	98	71	112

=== Cocaine seizures ===
Cocaine seems to arrive in Kosovo through postal deliveries or couriers from Serbia proper and/or South American countries, which are traditionally known for their cocaine production. It is first sent to Italy or Greece and usually in small quantities. The price for 1 gram of cocaine varied from EUR 45 to EUR 65 in 2007 and from EUR 50 to EUR 70 in 2008. The table below shows seizures of Cocaine from 2007 to 2010.

Description of activities	2007	2008	2009	2010
Number of seizures	3	4	3	2
Seized quantities, in kg	2	2	1.5	0.5
Persons arrested	6	7	4	2

=== Cannabis seizures ===
Cannabis is the only narcotic plant that is cultivated widely in Kosovo, for domestic use primarily. According to the Kosovo Police, during the 2007–10 periods, the cultivation of cannabis was spread in most parts of the country's territory. The table below shows seizures of cannabis from 2007 to 2010.

Description of activities	2007	2008	2009	2010
Cannabis plantations seized	35	23	35	42
Number of cannabis plants seized	21,712	9,249	33,497	9,724
Persons arrested	41	27	42	44

== Organ theft ==
Organ theft in Kosovo (sometimes also known as the "yellow house" case) refers to alleged organ harvesting and killing of an indeterminate number of "disappeared" people. Various sources estimate that the number of victims ranges from a "handful", up to 50, and between 24 and 100. By 2011, about 1,900 "disappeared" people (about two-thirds of them ethnic Albanians) still remained missing from the Kosovo conflict.

In 2010, a report by Swiss prosecutor Dick Marty to the Council of Europe (CoE) uncovered "credible, convergent indications" of an illegal trade in human organs going back over a decade, including the deaths of a "handful" of Serb captives allegedly killed for this purpose. On 25 January 2011, the report was endorsed by the CoE, which called for a full and serious investigation. Since the issuance of the report, however, senior sources in the European Union Rule of Law Mission in Kosovo (EULEX) and many members of the European Parliament have expressed serious doubts regarding the report and its foundations, believing Marty failed to provide "any evidence" concerning the allegations. A EULEX special investigation was launched in August 2011. EULEX found there was no evidence of organ trafficking.

== Firearms ==
As of 2006, Kosovo is no longer considered a transit-place for illegal weapons smuggling.

From 1999 until 2005, 15,432 illegal guns have been seized or collected from civilians in Kosovo.

== Human trafficking ==
According to Amnesty International, the aftermath of the war resulted in an increase in the trafficking of women for sexual exploitation. According to the IOM data, in 2000–2004, Kosovo was consistently ranked fourth or fifth among the countries of Southeastern Europe by number of human trafficking victims, after Albania, Moldova, Romania and sometimes Bulgaria.

== Police Force of Kosovo ==
The Kosovo Police is the police law enforcement agency of the Republic of Kosovo. The Police Force was initially formed in 1999, where the first candidates began training on 6 September. The first generation of police officers consisted of 176 members.

The United Nations Office on Drugs and Crime estimated that "Kosovo probably has the highest concentration of security personnel in the world". In 2008, there were a total of 26,233 security personnel, with 8,834 of them being Kosovo Police Officers.

As of 2013, the Police Force of Kosovo has a total of 51 stations across Kosovo, divided into seven regions, which are: Pristina, Peja, Mitrovica, Gjakova, Prizren, Gjilan and Ferizaj.

== Inter-ethnic crime ==
From 1981 to 1987, only five inter-ethnic murders occurred in Kosovo.

In post-war Kosovo, distinguishing between crimes as such and ethnically motivated crimes is difficult. Because of that, there are no reliable figures concerning inter-ethnic crime. Another major problem in exploring these crimes is the inconsistency between UNMIK data and the Kosovo Police.

There is a lot of tension between Kosovo Serbs and Kosovo Albanians in the North, in the region Mitrovica. The bridge that links the south part of the city with the north part of the city has become a stage for violence between the two ethnic groups. Such incidents as violence against the two ethnic groups are not as common in other parts of Kosovo.

== See also ==
- Corruption in Kosovo
