= Devolli Corporation =

Kosovo conglomerate

- Formerly: Devolli Commerce
- Type: Private
- Industry: Food and beverages; Furniture; Restaurants; Telecommunication; Transport; Mass media
- Founded: 1990; 36 years ago
- Founder: Ibrahim Devolli
- Headquarters: Pejë, Kosovo
- Area served: Kosovo; Albania; Montenegro; North Macedonia
- Key people: Shkëlqim Devolli (CEO)
- Products: Prince Caffe; Tango; Birra Peja; Finnesa
- Revenue: €400 million (2021)
- Number of employees: ~5000 (2023)
- Subsidiaries: Artmotion
- Website: devollicorporation.com

Devolli Corporation SH.P.K. is a Kosovan conglomerate headquartered in Pejë, Kosovo. It is best known for its food and beverage products, notably its coffee brand Prince Caffe. It was founded in 1990 by Kosovo businessman Ibrahim Devolli as Devolli Commerce. (Note: Colloquially, the name "Devolli Corporation" is used interchangeably with "Devolli Group", however these are two separate companies. Devolli Corporation is owned by Shkëlqim Devolli; Devolli Group is owned by Shkëlqim's brother Blerim Devolli.) entering into the coffee industry and then expanding into more markets, including the beverage industry in general, telecommunication, home furniture, media, and transportation. Considered to be the firm with the largest export from Kosovo, Devolli exports into at least 17 countries since 2017. The company's ownership was passed down to the founder's son, entrepreneur Shkëlqim Devolli, who serves as CEO.

== Products and brands ==
Devolli Corporation's portfolio includes products in the food industry, furniture, restaurants, transportation, media and telecommunication.

The company owns factories for several brands: a brewery in Peja for Birra Peja, a milk factory for Vita Milk, a flour factory in Rahovec for M&Sillosi, and a mattress factory called Ventius International LLC in Gjakova for Comodita Home.

Artmotion, a major competitor in cable and television in Kosovo, is owned by Devolli Corporation and located in the same building as its de facto flagship television channel, Klan Kosova, at the former Shock Absorber Factory in Fushë Kosovë.

=== Food and drink brands ===
- Prince Caffe
- Prince Quick
- M&Sillosi
- Birra Peja
- Tango Life
- Akull Water
- Vita Milk

=== Telecommunication and media ===
- Dardafon (traded as Z-Mobile)
- Artmotion
- Klan Kosova (de facto, owned by KGO Media Investments Holding)

=== Home ===
- Comodita Home

=== Others ===
- Prince Coffee House
- Customs Terminal
- Eurolab Homologation
- Devolli Logistic System

== Controversies ==
=== Trade suspension in the US ===
Devolli Corporation had a presence in the United States via its brands Finnesa, Prince Caffe, Comodita Home, and Prince Coffee House. The company's owner enforced Kosovo's co-operation with the US through Devolli's investment, in a meeting with Texas governor, Greg Abbott.

On 1 July 2022, the Department of Commerce started an investigation into Comodita Home's factory, following accusations of selling its mattresses for cheaper in the US while artificially inflating its prices in their country of origin, Kosovo, in a practice called dumping (which is used to squash competition in an unstable pricing market). The investigation concluded on 30 June 2023, and the Department of Commerce suspended Devolli Corporation from exporting its products to the US the following year.
