= Central Bank of Kosovo =

Monetary Authority of Kosovo

Central Bank of Kosovo Banka Qendrore e Republikës së Kosovës
- Central bank of: Kosovo
- Headquarters: Pristina
- Coordinates: 42.6600238°N 21.1584217°E
- Established: 2008
- Currency: Euro; EUR (ISO 4217)
- Reserves: € 1.177 billion
- Preceded by: Central Banking Authority of Kosovo
- Succeeded by: European Central Bank ^{1}
- Website: www.bqk-kos.org
- ^{1} Many policies are managed de facto by the ECB/eurosystem, even if the bank is not part of the Eurosystem or the European System of Central Banks.

The Central Bank of Kosovo (Albanian: Banka Qendrore e Republikës së Kosovës, Serbian: Централна банка Републике Косова / Centralna banka Republike Kosova, BQK in Albanian and CBK in English) is the central bank of Kosovo. It was established in 2008 as successor of the Banking and Payments Authority of Kosovo (Autoriteti Bankar dhe i Pagesave të Kosovës or BPK, 1999-2006) and Central Banking Authority of Kosovo (Autoriteti Qendror Bankar i Kosovës or AQBK, 2006-2008).

The official currency in Kosovo is the Euro, which was unilaterally adopted by the United Nations administration for Kosovo in 2002; however, Kosovo is not a member of the Eurozone. The headquarters of the CBK are located in the capital of Kosovo, Pristina.

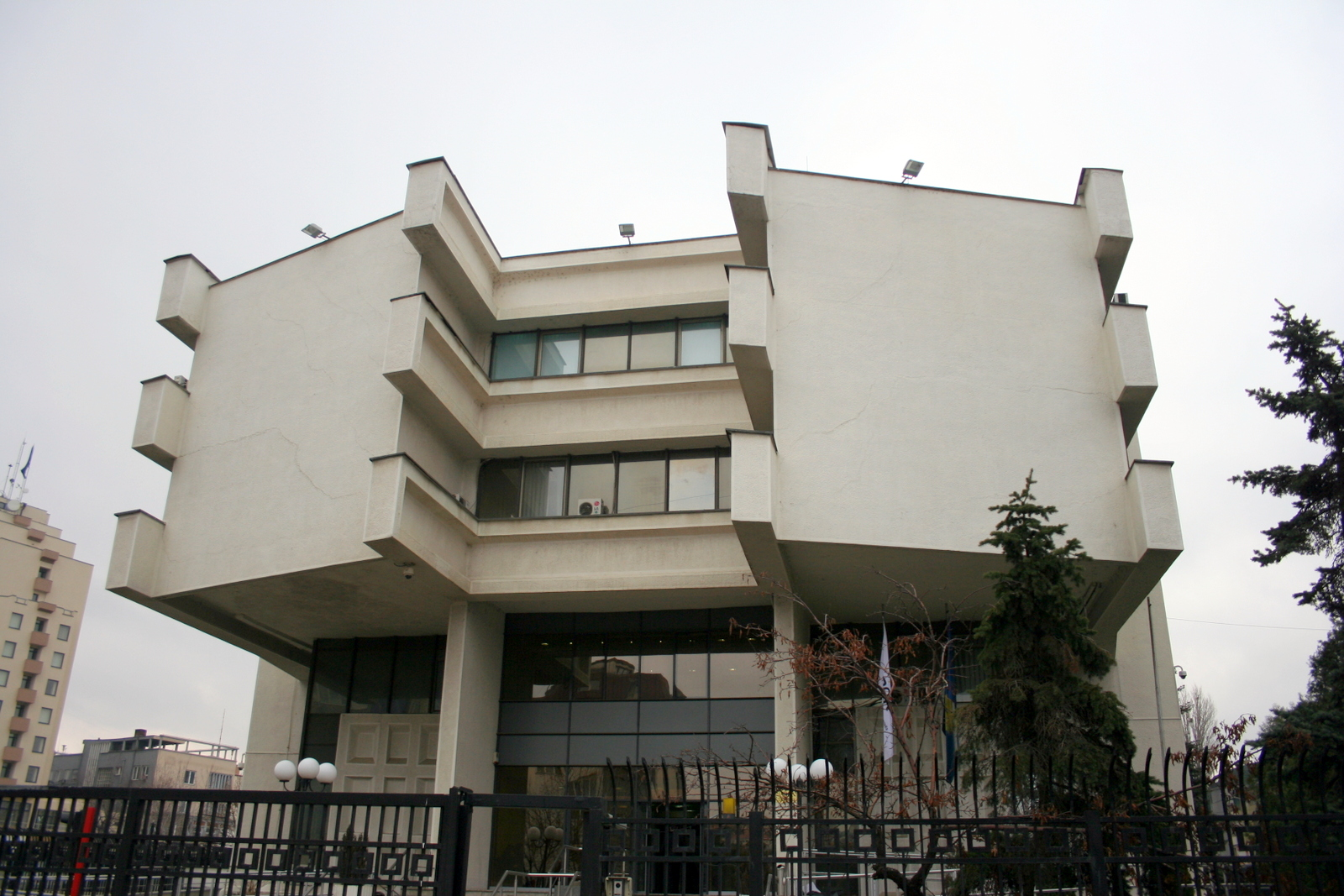
Headquarters of the Central Bank of Kosovo, Pristina.

== History ==
The National Bank of Kosovo (NBK) was originally established in 1972 under the decentralization reforms of that era, as one of eight so-called national banks complementing the National Bank of Yugoslavia (NBJ) within what was referred to as the System of National Banks. In the early 1990s at the start of the Yugoslav Wars, the system was recentralized and the NBK became a mere branch of the NBJ in the Federal Republic of Yugoslavia, losing its autonomous legal identity. Its building was heavily damaged by bombing during the Kosovo War in 1999.

The Banking and Payments Authority of Kosovo (BPK) was established in November 1999 by the Special Representative of the Secretary-General for Kosovo in the immediate aftermath of the Kosovo War. In 2006, the Special Representative enacted a new Regulation transforming the BPK into the Central Banking Authority of Kosovo (AQBK).

The Central Bank of the Republic of Kosovo was founded in June 2008, the same year Kosovo declared its independence from Serbia, under Law No. 03/L-074 enacted by the Assembly of the Republic of Kosovo.

== Functions and objectives ==
The following are the objectives of the Central Bank of Kosovo, as listed in "Objectives," Article 7, Chapter III of the Law No. 03/L-209

1. The primary objective of the Central Bank shall be to foster and to maintain a stable financial system, including a safe, sound and efficient payment system.
2. An additional objective of the Central Bank, which is subordinated to the primary objective of the Central Bank, is to contribute to achieving and maintaining domestic price stability.
3. Without prejudice to attainment of these two objectives, the Central Bank shall support the general economic policies of the Government.
4. The Central Bank shall act in accordance with the principle of an open market economy with free competition, favoring an efficient allocation of resources.

== Legal framework ==
=== Law on the Central Bank of the Republic of Kosovo ===
The Law No. 03/L-074 on the Central Bank of the Republic of Kosovo says that the CBK is a fully authorized legal organization, which has the capacity to "enter into contracts, institute legal proceedings and be subject to such proceedings; and acquire, administer, hold and dispose movable and immovable property." Its capital consists of an authorized budget of €30 million, which is controlled by the state and can be used only for its legal purposes. It is an administrative body which functions independently and under the full autonomy of its leading decision-making entities. The Central Bank of the Republic of Kosovo reports only to the Assembly of the Republic of Kosovo.

=== Tasks ===
The main tasks of the Central Bank, as in Article 8 of the same chapter, include maintaining a stable financial system; regulating the financial institutions as specified by law; promoting a safe payment system; maintain an appropriate supply of banknotes and coins within the country; holding and managing the international reserves; collecting and producing statistics; working on achieving price stability; informing the Government about its activities, and acting as an economic and financial adviser/banker for the Government, etc.

=== Operations ===
- Opening of accounts (Article 9) – The Central Bank of the Republic of Kosovo has the ability to open and maintain cash and securities accounts on its records for national and international financial institutions, as well as governmental and other types of organizations, if required.
- Custodial facilities (Article 10) – The Central Bank has the ability to provide custodial facilities to financial institutions and to the general public (for banknotes and coins) as well as other valuable assets (for securities).
- Market operations (Article 11) – The Central Bank has the ability to operate in financial markets by trading claims and other marketable instruments, and also conduct credit operations with banks and businesses
- Minimum reserves (Article 12) – The Central Bank has the ability to required banks to hold minimum reserves on deposit accounts with the Central Bank
- Instruments of credit control (Article 13) – The Central Bank has the ability to decide upon the use of such operational methods of credit control as it sees fit.
- Emergency liquidity assistance (Article 14) – The Central Bank has the ability to act as lender of last resort for a licensed bank, by granting financial assistance to banks or for their benefit.

=== International reserve management ===
According to Article 15 of the LAW no. 03/L-209 of Central Bank of the Republic of Kosovo, one of the functions of CBK is to conduct transactions in international reserves and manage such reserves consistent with international best practices and subject to its objectives set forth in Article 7 of LAW no. 03/L-209, respecting security, liquidity and yield, in that order of priority.

The Central Bank may hold in its portfolio of international reserves any or all of the following assets:

- Gold and other precious metals held by or for the account of the Central Bank, including credit balances representing such gold and other precious metals;
- Banknotes and coins denominated in freely convertible currencies held by or for the account of the Central Bank;
- Credit balances and interbank deposits that are payable on demand or within a short term denominated in freely convertible currencies and are held in accounts of the Central Bank;
- Readily-marketable debt securities denominated in freely convertible currencies issued by, or supported by, the full faith and credit of foreign governments, foreign central banks or international financial institutions;
- Claims on international financial institutions resulting from repurchase agreements, sale and buy back transactions and securities lending agreements in the debt securities;
- Special Drawing Rights (SDR) held in the account of Kosovo in the International Monetary Fund;
- The reserve position of Kosovo in the International Monetary Fund and other similar international financial organizations; and
- Any other readily marketable financial assets denominated in freely convertible currencies as determined by the executive board.

=== Currency ===
The currency, or the unit of account, that is used by the Central Bank and the national markets as a medium of exchange is the euro. The currency applied in the general as well as financial market is determined by the Constitutional authority, and the Central Bank single-handedly controls the issuance of banknotes and coins, with no other institution having that right. Furthermore, it manages the exchange of euro banknotes and coins, and the replacement of banknotes or coins that are visibly damaged by more than forty percent (40%) of their surface area. It also validates the process of reproducing banknotes and coins, and "the creation of any objects that by their design imitate any such banknote or coin" requires the approval from the Central Bank officials.

=== Licensing of banks ===
The CBK is also responsible for the licensing of banks in Kosovo. The following banks can be found under the current list.

- Banka për Biznes
- Raiffeisen Bank (Austria)
- Economic Bank
- ProCredit Bank
- TEB SH.A. (Turkey)
- NLB Prishtina (Slovenia)
- Banka Kombetare Tregtare - Kosove Branch (Albania)
- Turkiye Is Bankasi (Turkey)
- Komercijalna Banka Ad Beograd - Mitrovica Branch (Serbia)
- Credit Bank of Prishtina

=== Statistics and information ===
- The Central Bank can obtain, collect, and manage/publish information related to its activities. It controls the information flow presented to the public by media, and it collaborates with the government in the publication of statistics and other relevant information on activities that concern all the parties involved.

== Payment systems ==
The Banking and Payment Authorities of Kosovo (BPK) planned to establish an Interbank Payment System since November 2000. This idea was initially supported by the International Monetary Fond (IMF) through their professional payment consultants. The recommendations given were based on three development phases, which helped in creating the existing work plan. With the establishment of the Interbank Payments Advisory Committee (IPAC) under the patronage of the Central Bank of Kosovo with the participation of all the other commerce banks, the work continued on framing all the other operational policies on this subject.

Interbank Payment System has gone through three main phases.

=== First phase ===
Interbank Clearing System started to function on May 7, 2001. This phase was characterized with the manual exchange of payments, with settlements based on NET balance between debit and credit. In this way, the receiving bank account was credited and the debiting account was debited. At the start, since the number of payment was low, the registrations in account were done manually or on individual bases. This was reached with an agreement between the Interbank Clearing System (ICS) and other participating banks. Another interesting fact regarding the first phase was the activity of the Interbank Payments Advisory Committee (IPAC). This committee was first composed of several banks like ProCredit Bank, NLB Prishtina, Bank for Business. Moreover, Economic Bank joined in June and, towards the end of 2001, Raiffeissen Bank, BKP, and KSB joined also. The committee's obligation was to set the operating rules, the procedure, and standards for Interbank Clearing System. After a year, this committee worked toward Electronic Interbank Clearing System (EICS) which would make possible electronic exchange.

=== Second phase ===
The change into manual and semi-manual exchange led to other developments and transformations of the Electronic Interbank Clearing System (EICS). In 2002, the full transition to the electronic system was done. This was achieved in adherence to the necessary IT system and the consultations with KPMG-USAID. The second phase was also categorized with another success, which was the transition to the Standard Numbering System of the Kosovo Banking Accounts. With the assistance of other member banks, this standard reached to be applied to all bank payment accounts that resulted into the increment of the efficiency of the payment system, and more possibilities for new reforms. Another important event was the one on 7 September 2004 when the chief of the American office also the director of USAID acknowledged the Central Bank of Kosovo as the owner of the Electronic Interbank Clearing System present in Kosovo.

=== Third phase ===
With the establishment of the EICS system in 2007, the payments delivery system between central and local institutions was highly improved. This eventually progressed into an interconnected framework of all banks in Kosovo. Direct Debit, as the center's newest instrument of payments was first introduced in January 2009, after the approval of the Central Bank's Rule nr XXXI. The release for the general public has been made possible only in November, after the debit system was tested as a separate component in the Electronic Interbank Clearing System (EICS). The system was widely recognized by many banks, including ProCredit Bank, Raiffeissen Bank, NLB Prishtina, Bank for Business, Economic Bank, TEB and National Commercial Bank. The system's efficiency has been increased, which indirectly added to the standards and capacity of the interbank system. "Now every day the participants of the interbank payment system send more safely and efficiently about 15 thousand payments worth over 15 million Euros."

=== Development strategy ===
In 2009, the Central Bank of the Republic of Kosovo initiated many discussions on creating a long-term strategy. The discussions were finalized and approved by the Governing Board of the Central Bank on September 11, 2009, which in collaboration with the commercial banks and World Bank has created an Interbank Payment Systems Directorate (IPSD) within its body, which has the aim to ensure that the development strategies for the financial sector in Kosovo will be met.

The 9 pillars in this development strategy for the National Payments System (NPS) are:

1. Legal Framework
2. Large-value and time-critical payments
3. Retail payment systems
4. Government transactions
5. Securities depository, clearance and settlement
6. Money market
7. International remittances
8. Oversight
9. Cooperation (National Payments Council)

Real time gross settlement system (RTGS) remains the most important singular project which is being developed under the NPS.

== Strategic plan (2010–2015) ==
The Central Bank has set five strategic goals for five years of its operations, with the purpose of aligning the Bank's duties towards the citizens and the economy in general. These goals are:

1. To promote and foster financial stability in the Republic of Kosovo - The Central bank analyses the safety of the financial system, eliminates the potential risks and by creating analytical indicators, and also promotes a proper environment for operations
2. To support general economic policies to achieve sustainable economic growth in the Republic of Kosovo - The Central Bank encourages economic growth through better economic policy making, by conducting economic research and informing the public.
3. To ensure development of contemporary interbank systems and to provide effective banking services to customers - By using the Electronic Interbank Clearing System (EICS), the Central Bank functions as a hybrid system that facilitates the channeling of various payment instruments among banks.
4. To promote sound development of the financial sector in the Republic of Kosovo - The Central Bank of Kosovo aims to develop the financial sector by investing on the safeguard of the private market enterprises and on providing the government with their own experience. CBD tends to achieve this by framing a new legal framework for new financial products and accrediting new financial institutions.
5. To contribute to the processes for integration into European Union and other international institutions - This strategy includes investing on promoting the Republic of Kosovo and the Central Bank of Kosovo at an international level. This to be achieved by maintaining good relations with other counter-parties, applying international standards and attending seminars and event organized.

== Issuance of bonds ==
After signing a regulation for primary and secondary government bonds with the Ministry of Finance in December 2011, the Central Bank of Kosovo issued bonds for the first time on January 17, 2012. During its first auction, the CBK was able to collect a sum of €10 million worth of monetary assets. Another €64 million could be raised during the rest of 2012, bringing the total value of bonds issued during 2012 to €74 million, just as was declared by an adviser to the Minister of Finance on January 9, 2012. It is expected that during the course of 2013, the CBK will be able to raise a sum equal to €80 million.

== Board and governors of the CBK ==
=== Current Governing Board of the Central Bank of Kosovo ===
- Bashkim Nurboja - Chairman of Governing Board
- Nora Latifi - Jashari - Member of Governing Board
- Nexhat Kryeziu - Member of Governing Board

=== List of governors of the Central Bank of Kosovo ===
1. 2008–2010: Hashim Rexhepi
2. 2011–2013: Gani Gërguri
3. 2013–2017: Bedri Hamza
4. 2018–2023: Fehmi Mehmeti
5. 2023–present: Ahmet Ismaili

== Controversies ==
On 23 July 2010, Hashim Rexhepi, then the governor of the Central Bank of the Republic of Kosovo, was arrested based on grounds of "corruption and money laundering". According to EU's Rule of Law Mission EULEX, "the probe concerned suspected bribes, tax evasion, influence-peddling and money laundering". The arrest produced a lot of media attention since television pictures showed Rexhepi being led out of his office by "heavily armed" police officers. After being arrested, Rexhepi had to stay for four months in pre-trial imprisonment. The arrest and investigation was committed by EULEX. The indictment followed more than one year after the arrest; when that happened, the EULEX prosecutors dropped all of the most serious charges. Ultimately, on 11 January 2012, the decision became final and Hashim Rexhepi was found innocent. The accusations and imprisonment, however, cost Hashim Rexhepi to lose his job as governor of Kosovo's central bank.

== See also ==
- Ministry of Finance (Kosovo)
- Economy of Kosovo
- Kosovo and the euro
- Banking Network System of Kosovo
- List of central banks
- List of financial supervisory authorities by country
