= Banking in Kosovo =

Banking in Kosovo has been developing significantly since the country declared its independence in 2008. Banking in Kosovo is made up of a network centered on the Central Bank of Kosovo (CBK) with the nodes being commercial banks and other micro financial institutions.

== History ==
The banking network of the country was devastated during the Kosovo War. As a new country Kosovo has gone through state building institutions and public reforms. The country's banking network system has been developed from scratch.

== Structure ==
The Kosovo banking network system is an informal and complex network in a sense that it ensures the flow of financial transactions and macroeconomic stability in the country including the Central Bank and other micro financial institutions. The central hub of the network is considered to be the Central Bank of Kosovo (CBK) which is a successor of the Banking Payments and Authority of Kosovo established in June 2008. It is an independent legal entity and reports directly to the Kosovo Assembly. The Central Bank is considered as a central hub because all other micro financial institutions are connected to the Central Bank and are under its supervision.

The nodes of the Kosovo Network Banking system are the mainly commercial banks and other micro financial institutions. The Kosovo network banking system is compounded of eight commercial banks, ten saving and credit association, 12 micro-finance institutions four other non-banking financial institutions and eight insurance companies.

On the other hand, the commercial banks and other micro financial institution have their own network as well. Each commercial bank has its headquarters in the capital in Pristina. They also have regional headquarters in the regions and branches in other cities. Kosovo administratively has six regions: Pristina (capital city), Mitrovica, Gjilan, Prizren, Ferizaj, and Peja. Each and every institution has regional base/branches in their respective regions. There are several independent networks of the banks and other micro financial institution within the Kosovo Banking Network System, and they are all connected to the Central Bank. Each banking network has its own central hub the headquarters and its nodes other banks across the country and they are directly linked to their central hub. In addition, they are interconnected among themselves and they form cluster within the network. There is not much data about the characteristics of the network such as degree distribution and other statistical interpretations.

Centrality of the network plays a crucial role in the Kosovo Banking, as each network depends on their central hub respectively the central bank or the bank's headquarters.

Eight different Bank's networks form a complex network of Kosovo Banking Network System. An interbank network is also present and functional in Kosovo, as the ATMs are functional for foreign transactions and withdrawal of cash among banks.

== See also ==
- List of banks in Kosovo
