= Corruption in Kosovo =

Corruption in Kosovo describes the prevention and occurrence of corruption in Kosovo. According to several public surveys in Kosovo and reports from institutions such as the European Commission, levels of corruption and impunity among politicians are high.

== Perceptions ==
On Transparency International's 2025 Corruption Perceptions Index, Kosovo scored 43 on a scale from 0 ("highly corrupt") to 100 ("very clean"). When ranked by score, Kosovo ranked 76th among the 182 countries in the Index, where the country ranked first is perceived to have the most honest public sector. For comparison with regional scores, the best score among Eastern European and Central Asian countries (Note: Albania, Armenia, Azerbaijan, Belarus, Bosnia and Herzegovina, Georgia, Kazakhstan, Kosovo, Kyrgyzstan, Moldova, Montenegro, North Macedonia, Russia, Serbia, Tajikistan, Turkey, Turkmenistan, Ukraine, Uzbekistan) was 50, the average score was 34 and the worst score was 17. For comparison with worldwide scores, the best score was 89 (ranked 1), the average score was 42, and the worst score was 9 (ranked 181, in a two-way tie).

== Dynamics ==
The European Commission reports that electoral fraud persists in Kosovo representing serious shortcomings in the electoral process. Transparency International Global Corruption Barometer 2013 points out that political parties are considered the second most corrupt institution in Kosovo by a significantly high number of households, second only to the judiciary.

Corruption is considered the largest obstacle to doing business in Kosovo, and businesses frequently resort to bribes when interacting with public officials. Sectors such as customs, manufacturing, electricity, gas and water supply are identified as those most affected by corruption. There are a number of burdensome and costly procedures for companies to undergo in order to obtain business licences and permits, these lead to increased opportunities for corruption.

== See also ==
- Crime in Kosovo
