= IPKO =

Kosovan telecommunications company

IPKO Telecommunications
- Formerly: Internet Project Kosovo (1999-2001); IPKO Net (2001-2008)
- Type: Subsidiary
- Industry: Mobile telecommunications (Kosovo)
- Founded: 20 September 1999; 27 years ago (Kosovo)
- Headquarters: Pristina, Kosovo
- Key people: András Páli (CEO)
- Products: Mobile networks, Telecom services, ISP, Cable Television etc. (Kosovo)
- Parent: Telekom Slovenije
- Website: Official website

IPKO is a telecommunication company in Kosovo. It is the second largest mobile operator in the country. Their services include mobile telephony, fixed telephony, internet service and cable TV. IPKO also has an OTT platform. The sole owner of the company is Telekom Slovenije.

== History ==
IPKO was founded as a non-government organisation in 1999. The IPKO name derived from Internet Project Kosovo. In 2001, the organisation transitioned into a company: IPKO Net. In 2006, IPKO was bought by Telekom Slovenije. In 2007, IPKO started mobile operations, becoming the second mobile operator in Kosovo.

Telekom Slovenije put IPKO up for sale in July 2019 with an EBIDTA of 30 million Euros. For a brief time, Telekom Srbija offered to buy the company for 155 million Euros whereas the entrepreneur Shkëlqim Devolli (owner of the Devolli Corporation, which operates the competitor Artmotion) offered 153 million Euros. The sale was rejected by ARKEP, Kosovo's regulatory authority for telecommunication.

In July 2023, IPKO gained a 5G license. IPKO is the largest foreign investment company in Kosovo, which for 15 years of its operation it has invested €400,000,000 in mobile and fixed infrastructure.

== Services ==
=== Mobile ===
The IPKO network covers 99.7% of the population of Kosovo and 98.5% of the territory. Dialling codes for IPKO are: 043, 048 and 049 (internationally +383 43, +383 48 and +383 49). Identification code (IMSI) of IPKO is 221–02. The IPKO network maintenance is contracted to Ericsson Nikola Tesla.

=== Television ===
Digital cable and IPTV is now offered in the majority of the cities in Kosovo: Pristina, Gjilan, Ferizaj, Prizren, Mitrovica, Gjakova, Vushtrri, Viti, Deçan, Klina, Peja, Kaçanik, Kamenica, Podujevë and Istog.
