= Post and Telecom of Kosovo =

Post and telecommunications company in Kosovo

Post and Telecom of Kosovo Пошта и Телекомуникације Косова Posta dhe Telekomi i Kosovës
- Formerly: The Post, Telephone and Telegraph of Kosovo (1959–1990)
- Type: Joint stock company
- Industry: Communications services
- Founded: 1959 (67 years ago)
- Headquarters: Pristina, Republic of Kosovo
- Area served: Republic of Kosovo
- Key people: Besa Shatri-Berisha
- Products: Mobile telephony Fixed telephony ISP; Cable television
- Owner: Government of Kosovo
- Number of employees: 2,480
- Website: kosovotelecom.com

Post and Telecom of Kosovo (commonly abbreviated as PTK; Albanian: Posta dhe Telekomi i Kosovës) is the postal and telecommunications authority of the Republic of Kosovo.

== History ==
The company was founded in 1959, originally under the name of The Post, Telephone and Telegraph of Kosovo, and adopted its current name on 12 September 1990.

PTK stopped operating only during the 1998–1999 Kosovo War. During the conflict, assets of the company were either stolen or destroyed, leading to interruptions of postal and telecommunication services.

After the conflict, PTK launched Vala, the largest mobile operator in the country, with the assistance of Monaco Telecom. Vala was the first licensed mobile operator in Kosovo.

On 29 June 2005, Post and Telecom of Kosovo was transformed into a joint stock company, with the new name PTK J.S.C. The authority has three business units: Post of Kosovo, Telecom of Kosovo, and Vala. The units are licensed by the Telecommunication Regulation Authority of Kosovo.

In operation since 2000, Vala is the largest mobile operator in Kosovo with approximately 1,150,000 customers. An LTE network has been built by Vala, powered by Alcatel Lucent and Nokia Networks.

Dialling codes for Vala are: 044, 045 and 046 (internationally +383 44, +383 45 and +383 46. Identification code (IMSI) of Vala is 221-01.

== See also ==
- Telephone numbers in Kosovo
- Postal codes in Kosovo
