= Big Brother (Slovenian TV series) =

Slovenianl reality television series

- Also known as: Big Brother Slovenija
- Genre: Reality competition
- Based on: Big Brother by John de Mol Jr.
- Presented by: Nina Osenar (2007–2008, 2010); Matej Grm - Gusti (2008); Ana Maria Mitič (2015); Manja Plešnar (2016)
- Country of origin: Slovenia
- Original language: Slovene
- No. of seasons: 5

Production
- Production company: Endemol

Original release
- Network: Kanal A; POP TV
- Release: 17 March 2007 – 9 June 2016

Related
- Big Brother Slavnih

Big Brother Slovenija is the Slovenian version of the international reality television franchise Big Brother created by producer John de Mol Jr. in 1997. The show was originally broadcast on Kanal A in 2007, 2008, 2015 and 2016. A celebrity season was aired in 2010 on POP TV. The show followed a number of contestants, known as housemates, who are isolated from the outside world for an extended period of time in a custom-built house and trying to avoid being evicted by the public with the aim of winning a large cash prize at the end of the run.

== Series details ==
=== Regular season ===
Season	Network	Slogan	Launch date	Finale date	Days	Housemates	Winner	Grand prize	Presenter(s)	Ratings share	Rating
Big Brother 1	Kanal A	Big Brother vas gleda! (Big Brother is watching you!)	17 March 2007	9 June 2007	85	18	Andrej Novak	€75,000	Nina Osenar	30%	7.8%
Big Brother 2	Kanal A	Big Brother vas gleda! (Big Brother is watching you!)	14 March 2008	14 June 2008	93	17	Naske Mehič	€92,000	Nina Osenar; Matej Grm - Gusti	28%	7.2%
Big Brother 3	Kanal A	Pričakuj nepričakovano! (Expect the unexpected!)	6 March 2015	19 June 2015	106	23	Pia Filipčič	€50,000	Ana Maria Mitič	19.4%	
Big Brother 4	Kanal A	Vem, da si upaš! (I know you dare!); Skrivnosti in laži! (Secrets and lies)	26 February 2016	9 June 2016	104	23	Mirela Lapanović	€50,000	Manja Plešnar	25.7%	

=== Celebrity season ===
Season	Network	Slogan	Launch date	Finale date	Days	Housemates	Winner	Grand prize	Presenter	Ratings share	Rating
Big Brother Slavnih	POP TV	Ali so slavni drugačni kot vi? (Are celebrities different from you?); Prepričajte se na lastne oči. (Make sure through your eyes.)	3 October 2010	12 December 2010	71	14	Jože Činč	€90,000	Nina Osenar	43%	13.5%

== The house ==
=== 2007–2010 ===
- A 550 m^{2} (5,900 sq ft) Big Brother house is situated in the backyard of Pro Plus building in Ljubljana.
- There is a 300 m^{2} (3,200 sq ft) dwelling, and a 250 m^{2} (2,700 sq ft) garden. The house's interior is covered by 22 cameras.
- Bathroom, toilets, and showers which cannot be locked for security reasons, are also covered by cameras.
- Essential kitchenware can be found in the kitchen along with sink, electric cooker, oven, refrigerator, and a silverware container.
- Housemates can eat self-cooked meals at a big 12-chair dining table in the dining room.
- Comfortable divans are found in the living room which can be used in free time.
- Big Brother house features two four-bedded bedrooms, two of which are double. Every housemate receives one bedding set, which they have to wash and make themselves. Even here every movement and whisper are recorded by cameras.
- Housemates are frequently called into confessional, where they share their experiences with Big Brother. A person may enter confessional only when the empty and green light is lit above it. A chair and table can be found inside.
- Very important part of the Big Brother house is a depository, where much-earned food and accessories for various tasks are dropped off. The depository is, except on Saturdays and Sundays, open only one hour a day, possible break-ins are prevented by the electric lock.

=== 2015 ===
Big Brother Slovenija 2015 was filmed in Serbia, where the regional version of Big Brother—Veliki Brat is filmed. The house is located in Belgrade, in the urban neighborhood of Kosutnjak. The house was built in 2006 for the Serbian Big Brother. The house consists of a confessional, a bedroom, a living room, a kitchen, a dining room, a bathroom, a pantry, a garden and an extra space called Elite section, used throughout the season as a secret room. The house also has a swimming pool.

=== 2016 ===
Big Brother Slovenija was back in Slovenia, however, it is not located next to the Pro Plus building, but in Vevče near the tennis courts.

== Broadcasting ==
=== Regular seasons ===
Season	Monday	Tuesday	Wednesday	Thursday	Friday	Saturday	Sunday
Big Brother 1	Daily recaps (20:00–20:30)					Live Eviction Show (20:00–22:00)	Live Nomination Show (20:00–20:40)
Big Brother 2	Daily recaps (20:00–21:00)				Live Eviction Show (20:00–22:00)	Live Nomination Show (20:00–20:30)	Weekly recaps (22:00–23:00)
Big Brother 3	Daily recaps 20:00, 21:00, 21:20 or 21:30 (90 minutes)				Live Eviction & Nomination Show; 20:00 (120 minutes)	Daily recaps 20:00 (90 minutes)	
Big Brother 4	Daily recaps Big Brother Klub; Live from the Big Brother house 20:00 (60 min + 30 min + 30 min)					Live Eviction Show; Live from the Big Brother house (Nomination); Daily recaps 20:00 (90 min + 15 min + 30 min)	—N/a

=== Celebrity season ===
Season	Monday	Tuesday	Wednesday	Thursday	Friday	Saturday	Sunday
Big Brother Slavnih	Talk show with evicted housemates (20:00–20:30)	Daily recaps (20:00–21:00)					Live Eviction Show (20:00–22:00)
