= Big Brother (Slovenian TV series) season 3 =

Big Brother
- Season 3
- Presented by: Ana Maria Mitič
- No. of days: 106
- No. of housemates: 23
- Winner: Pia Filipčič
- Runner-up: Ana Mari Panker

Release
- Original network: Kanal A
- Original release: 6 March – 19 June 2015

Series chronology
- ← Previous; Big Brother Slavnih Next → Big Brother 4

Big Brother Slovenija 2015 is the third main season of the Slovenian version of Big Brother, which is broadcast on Kanal A. This is the first civilian season of Big Brother to air in Slovenia since 2008. The show also had a celebrity season in 2010, however, it aired on another channel, POP TV. Though the season launched on March 6, 2015, three housemates entered prior to the launch. These three housemates were already living in a Secret Room, without the audience or housemates knowledge. The host of the show this season Ana Maria Mitič. Due to budget restraints this season the house is not located in Slovenia. Instead, it is located in the old Veliki Brat house, in Serbia which was home to the Balkan version of the show. The Season was won by 21-year-old Pia Filipčič

== Housemates ==
=== Ana H ===
Ana Hrovat is 22 and from Mislinja. Ana H was evicted on Day 105.

=== Ana J ===
Ana Jeler is 20 and from Piran. Ana J was part of the five new housemates who entered on day 50. Ana J walked out of the house on Day 62.

=== Ana Mari ===
Ana Mari Panker is 22 and from Veščica. Ana Mari was the Runner Up on Day 106.

=== Darja ===
Darja Vrbnjak is 46 and from Štore. She's the mother of David. Darja was evicted on Day 43.

=== David ===
David Vrbnjak is a 25-year-old engineer from Štore. He's the son of Darja. David was evicted on Day 92.

=== Dijana ===
Dijana Branilovič is 34 and from Jesenice. Dijana was evicted on Day 22.

=== Franc ===
Franc Rozman is 68 and from Izola. Franc entered the house on day 50 as one of five new housemates. Franc was evicted on Day 78.

=== Ksenija ===
Ksenija Kranjec is 23 and from Slovenj Gradec. Ksenija was evicted on Day 15.

=== Marko ===
Marko Ubiparip is 21 and from Ljubljana. Marko was evicted on Day 29.

=== Martin ===
Martin Flis is 24 and from Krško. Martin entered the house on day 50 along with four other housemates. Martin was evicted on Day 99.

=== Mitja ===
Mitja Valant is 27 and from Drevenik. Mitja was one of five housemates to enter the house on day 50. Mitja was evicted on Day 105.

=== Nina ===
Nina Golub is 21 and from Maribor. Nina was evicted on Day 57.

=== Pia ===
Pia Filipčič is 21 and from Koper. She entered in a Secret Room the day before the launch. Shortly after entering the house it was revealed via media sources that Pia was born a biological male under the name Elvis Filipčič. Pia won the season on Day 106.

=== Sebastjan B ===
Sebastjan Burnar is a 30-year-old programmer from Ivančna Gorica. Sebastjan B came Fourth on Day 106.

=== Sebastjan Z ===
Sebastjan Zajc is 27 and from Moravče. Sebastjan z was evicted on Day 50.

=== Soraja ===
Soraja Vučelić was a housemate in Veliki brat 2011 and Veliki Brat VIP 5. Soraja was evicted on Day 105

=== Suzana ===
Suzana Jakšič was a housemate in Big Brother 1 and Kmetija Slavnih. Suzana was evicted on Day 105.

=== Tibor ===
Tibor Baiee is 28 and from Ljubljana. Tibor was evicted on Day 71.

=== Tina ===
Tina Lukić is 29 and from Maribor. She entered in a Secret Room the day before the launch. Tina walked out of the house on Day 39, 3 days after Ziga's eviction.

=== Tomaž ===
Tomaž Jeraj is 35 and from Brezovica. He entered in a Secret Room the day before the launch. Tomaž came Third on Day 106.

=== Vlado ===
Vlado Pilja is a singer. Vlado was evicted on Day 99.

=== Žiga ===
Žiga Puconja is a 29-year-old fashion consultant from Ljubljana. Žiga was evicted on day 36.

== Nominations table ==
The first Housemate in each box was Nominated for Two Points, and the second Housemate was Nominated for One Point.

| | Week 1 | Week 2 | Week 3 | Week 4 | Week 5 | Week 6 | Week 7 | Week 8 | Week 10 | Week 11 | Week 13 | Week 14 | Week 15 | Final | |
|---|---|---|---|---|---|---|---|---|---|---|---|---|---|---|---|
| Pia | Secret; Room | | Nina/Sebastjan Z Dijana/Tina | Marko; Sebastjan Z | David; Tomaž | David; Darja | Sebastjan Z Sebastjan B | David; Nina | Franc; David | David; Franc | David; Sebastjan B | Vlado; Ana Mari | No; Nominations | Winner (Day 106) | |
| Ana Mari | Sebastjan B Ana H | In The Elite | Nina/Sebastjan Z Dijana/Tina | Tina; Nina | Ana H Tomaž | Nina; Darja | Nina; Sebastjan Z | Nina; Pia | Franc; David | Franc; Martin | Martin; Sebastjan B | Vlado; Martin | No; Nominations | Runner-Up (Day 106) | |
| Tomaž | Secret; Room | In The Elite | Dijana/Tina; Žiga/Marko | Marko; Nina | Pia; Sebastjan Z | Nina; David | Nina; Sebastjan Z | Pia; Nina | Tibor; Franc | David; Franc | David; Ana Mari | Suzana; Martin | No; Nominations | Third place (Day 106) | |
| Sebastjan B | Marko; Ana H | In The Elite | Nina/Sebastjan Z Dijana/Tina | Darja; Marko | Žiga; Tomaž | Darja; David | Nina; Sebastjan Z | Pia; Nina | Franc; Tibor | Franc; Martin | Ana Mari; David | Vlado; Ana Mari | No; Nominations | Fourth place (Day 106) | |
| Ana H | Marko; Sebastjan B | Not in The Elite | Dijana/Tina; Žiga/Marko | Žiga; Marko | Žiga; Darja | Darja; David | Sebastjan Z Sebastjan B | David; Nina | Tibor; Franc | David; Franc | David; Ana Mari | Vlado; Ana Mari | No; Nominations | Evicted (Day 105) | |
| Mitja | Not in House | | | | | | | Nina; Pia | Tibor; David | David; Martin | David; Ana Mari | Soraja; Ana Mari | No; Nominations | Evicted (Day 105) | |
| Soraja | Not in House | | | | | | | | | | Guest | Vlado; Ana Mari | No; Nominations | Evicted (Day 105) | |
| Suzana | Not in House | | | | | | | | | | Guest | Vlado; Ana Mari | No; Nominations | Evicted (Day 105) | |
| Martin | Not in House | | | | | | | Nina; David | David; Tibor | Franc; David | David; Ana Mari | Vlado; Ana Mari | Evicted (Day 99) | | |
| Vlado | Not in House | | | | | | | | | | Guest | Pia; Ana Mari | Evicted (Day 99) | | |
| David | Ksenija; Sebastjan Z | In The Elite | Dijana/Tina; Žiga/Marko | Marko; Tina | Sebastjan Z Nina | Nina; Darja | Sebastjan Z Nina | Nina; Pia | Franc; Tibor | Franc; Martin | Martin; Pia | Evicted (Day 92) | | | |
| Franc | Not in House | | | | | | | David; Nina | Tibor; David | David; Martin | Evicted (Day 78) | | | | |
| Tibor | Ana H Sebastjan B | Secret; Room | Nina/Sebastjan Z Dijana/Tina | Darja; Sebastjan Z | Tomaž; Sebastjan Z | Darja; Nina | Nina; Sebastjan Z | Nina; Pia | Franc; David | Evicted (Day 71) | | | | | |
| Ana J | Not in House | | | | | | | David; Nina | Walked (Day 62) | | | | | | |
| Nina | Žiga; Dijana | Not in The Elite | Žiga/Marko; Dijana/Tina | Žiga; Marko | Žiga; Tomaž | David; Darja | Sebastjan Z Sebastjan B | David; Pia | Evicted (Day 57) | | | | | | |
| Sebastjan Z | Ksenija; Tibor | Not in The Elite | Žiga/Marko; Dijana/Tina | Marko; Tomaž | David; Tomaž | Darja; David | Sebastjan B Nina | Evicted (Day 50) | | | | | | | |
| Darja | Nina; Ana H | In The Elite | Dijana/Tina; Žiga/Marko | Banned | Nina; Ana H | Nina; David | Evicted (Day 43) | | | | | | | | |
| Tina | Secret; Room | | Nina/Sebastjan Z Ana/David | Sebastjan Z Marko | Pia; Tomaž | Walked (Day 39) | | | | | | | | | |
| Žiga | Sebastjan B Ana H | In The Elite | Nina/Sebastjan Z Tomaž/Darja | Tomaž; Nina | Tomaž; Nina | Evicted (Day 36) | | | | | | | | | |
| Marko | Ana H Žiga | In The Elite | Nina/Sebastjan Z Tomaž/Darja | Tomaž; Nina | Evicted (Day 29) | | | | | | | | | | |
| Dijana | Ana; Nina | In The Elite | Nina/Sebastjan Z Ana/David | Evicted (Day 22) | | | | | | | | | | | |
| Ksenija | David; Sebastjan B | Not in The Elite | Evicted (Day 15) | | | | | | | | | | | | |
| Notes | 1, 2, 3 | | 4, 5 | 6, 7, 8 | 9 | 10 | 11 | 12, 13 | 15, 16 | 17 | 17 | none | | | |
| Up for eviction | Sebastjan Z Tibor; Žiga | Ana H Ksenija; Nina; Sebastjan Z | Dijana; Marko; Nina; Sebastjan Z Žiga | Marko; Tina; Tomaž | David; Pia; Nina; Sebastjan Z Tomaž; Žiga | All; Housemates | | Ana H Ana Mari; David; Nina; Pia; Sebastjan B Tibor; Tomaž | All; Housemates | Ana Mari; David; Franc; Martin; Pia; Sebastjan B | Ana Mari; David; Martin | Ana Mari; Martin; Pia; Soraja; Suzana; Vlado | Ana H Ana Mari; Mitja; Pia; Sebastjan B Tomaž | Ana Mari; Pia; Sebastjan B Tomaž | |
| Walked | none | | | | | Tina | none | | none | | | | | | |
| Evicted | Tibor; 3/3 votes to move | Ksenija; Most votes to evict | Dijana; Most votes to evict | Marko; Most votes to evict | Žiga; Most votes to evict | Darja; 14 of 33 Points to evict | Sebastjan Z 14 of 30 Points to evict | Nina; 18 of 42 Points to evict | Tibor; 13 of 33 Points to evict | Franc; 13 of 30 Points to evict | David; Most votes to evict | Vlado; Most votes to evict | Mitja; Fewest votes to win | Sebastjan B Fewest votes to win | Tomaž; Fewest votes to win |
| Evicted | Tibor; 3/3 votes to move | Ksenija; Most votes to evict | Dijana; Most votes to evict | Marko; Most votes to evict | Žiga; Most votes to evict | Darja; 14 of 33 Points to evict | Sebastjan Z 14 of 30 Points to evict | Nina; 18 of 42 Points to evict | Tibor; 13 of 33 Points to evict | Franc; 13 of 30 Points to evict | David; Most votes to evict | Martin; Most votes to evict | Ana H Fewest votes to win | Ana Mari; Fewest votes to win | |
| Survived | | Nina; 2nd Sebastjan Z 3rd Ana H 4th | Marko; Nina; Sebastjan Z Žiga | Tina; Tomaž | Nina; 2nd Tomaž; 3rd Pia; 4th David; 5th Sebastjan Z 6th | Nina; 10 of 33 Points to evict David; 9 of 33 Points to evict | Nina; 11 of 30 Points to evict Sebastjan B 5 of 30 Points to evict | David; 13 of 42 Points to evict Pia; 11 of 42 Points to evict | Franc; 12 of 33 Points to evict David; 6 of 33 Points to evict | David; 11 of 30 Points to evict Martin; 6 of 33 Points to evict | Martin; 2nd Ana Mari; 3rd | Suzana; 3rd Pia; 4th Soraja; 5th Ana Mari; 6th | Ana Mari; Pia; Sebastjan B Tomaž; Most votes | Pia; Most votes to win | |
| Survived | | Nina; 2nd Sebastjan Z 3rd Ana H 4th | Marko; Nina; Sebastjan Z Žiga | Tina; Tomaž | Nina; 2nd Tomaž; 3rd Pia; 4th David; 5th Sebastjan Z 6th | Nina; 10 of 33 Points to evict David; 9 of 33 Points to evict | Nina; 11 of 30 Points to evict Sebastjan B 5 of 30 Points to evict | Tomaž; 1st-3rd | Mitja; 1st-3rd Ana H 4th Sebastjan B 5th Martin; 6th | Sebastjan B 1st-3rd | Martin; 2nd Ana Mari; 3rd | Suzana; 3rd Pia; 4th Soraja; 5th Ana Mari; 6th | Ana Mari; Pia; Sebastjan B Tomaž; Most votes | Pia; Most votes to win | |
| Survived | | Nina; 2nd Sebastjan Z 3rd Ana H 4th | Marko; Nina; Sebastjan Z Žiga | Tina; Tomaž | Nina; 2nd Tomaž; 3rd Pia; 4th David; 5th Sebastjan Z 6th | Ana H Ana Mari; Pia; Sebastjan B Sebastjan Z Tibor; Tomaž; 4th-10th | Ana H Ana Mari; Pia; David; Tibor; Tomaž; 4th-9th | Ana H Ana Mari; Sebastjan B Tibor; 5th-8th | Ana Mari; Pia; Tomaž; 8th-10th | Ana Mari; Pia; 5th-6th | Martin; 2nd Ana Mari; 3rd | Suzana; 3rd Pia; 4th Soraja; 5th Ana Mari; 6th | Ana Mari; Pia; Sebastjan B Tomaž; Most votes | Pia; Most votes to win | |

=== Blind Results ===
Percentages (During Live Show)
| Week | 1stPlace to Evict | 2ndPlace to Evict | 3rdPlace to Evict | 4thPlace to Evict | 5thPlace to Evict | 6thPlace to Evict |
|---|---|---|---|---|---|---|
| 2 | 47% | 42% | 7% | 4% | | |
| 3 | 42% | 29% | 24% | 4% | 1% | |
| 4 | 65% | 28% | 7% | | | |
| 5 | 54% | 15% | 12% | 8% | 7% | 4% |

Notes:

^1 From day 1, Secret Room residents Pia, Tina, and Tomaž were told that they had to remain hidden from the other housemates. As long as they remain hidden they will be immune from nominations.
^2 At the end of the first week a fake round of nominations was held. These nominations were void as the Secret Room housemates decided who would actually be nominated. A few days later the housemates in the Secret Room were told that they would choose one of the nominees to be fake evicted to the Secret Room. After this they were then asked to choose one of their own to enter the main house. They chose Tomaž.
^3 Upon entering the main house, Tomaž was called to the Diary Room. He was then told that he was to be the head of a group known as "The Elite". As part of the elite he, and anyone else selected to join, would be immune from the first eviction. Big Brother then asked him to select two other founding members, he chose Ana Mari and David. The group chose Darja to join them on day 9, Žiga on day 10, and Dijana, Marko, and Sebastjan B on day 11. The remaining housemates failed to enter the elite and were nominated for the first eviction.
^4 Keeping with the partner theme for week 3 housemates would nominate in pairs. Along with this twist housemates would nominate four housemates, two for two points and two for one point, as opposed to two.
^5 As original secret room residents, Tomaž and Tina were still immune from eviction in week 3, however contestants were not told this prior to nominations. All points received by either housemate were deemed void.
^6 As reward for winning the title of "Ultimate Pair", Ana Mari and Sebastjan B were immune in week 4.
^7 Being new entrants to the house in week 4 both Pia and Tibor were immune from eviction.
^8 In week 4, Darja was banned from nominating.
^9 Following the singing competition at the end of week 4 a public vote was held to decide a winner. Ana Mari and Tina received the most votes and were deemed the winners of the competition. As reward both housemates were given immunity in week 5.
^10 In week 6 there were no nominations as all of the housemates were up for eviction in a vote to save. Darja, David and Nina were the bottom 3, and the rest of the housemates voted to evict with 2 and 1 points. Tibor had the power to save one of the three nominated housemates from eviction but chose not to. Tibor also had extra points to nominate.
^11 Like in week 6, in week 7 there were no nominations as all of the housemates were up for eviction in a vote to save. Nina, Sebastjan B and Sebastjan Z were the bottom 3, and the rest of the housemates voted to evict with 2 and 1 points. David had the power to save one of the three nominated housemates from eviction but chose not to. David also had extra points to nominate.
^12 Again in week 8 there were no nominations as all of the housemates were up for eviction in a vote to save. David, Nina, and Pia were the bottom 3, and the rest of the housemates voted to evict with 2 and 1 points. Tomaž had the power to save one of the three nominated housemates from eviction. Tomaž also had extra points to nominate.
^13 Initially, David, Nina, and Tomaž were nominated for eviction after receiving the least save votes. Tomaž used his power to save himself from eviction and Pia, who had the fourth fewest votes, was nominated in his place.
^14 Franc, Tina and Sebastjan B were nominated for eviction after receiving the least save votes. Ana Mari had the power to save one of the nominees and extra points to nominate. Ana Mari chose not to save the nominees.
^15 Prior to the ninth eviction, Ana, Mitja and Tomaž were offered an opportunity to purchase immunity for the remainder of the season. They eventually chose to take the immunity.
^16 Though Mitja was one of the three lowest vote getters in week ten after having purchased seasonal immunity he was safe from eviction. The fourth lowest vote getter, Ana, also purchased immunity, meaning that the fifth lowest vote getter, Martin, would have been the next in line for eviction, however he too was immune as a result of the weekly task. This left the sixth lowest vote getter, Sebastjan B, to take the place as the third nominee, however Mitja used his power to save on him, meaning that Tibor, the person with the seventh lowest (fourth highest) vote count was left to face eviction.

^17 Following the entrance of the guests (new housemates) in week 12, the nominations process reverted to the original way.

=== Total Nominations Received ===
| | Week 1 | Week 2 | Week 3 | Week 4 | Week 5 | Week 6 | Week 7 | Week 8 | Week 9 | Week 10 | Week 11 | Week 13 | Week 14 | Week 15 | Week 16 | Total |
|---|---|---|---|---|---|---|---|---|---|---|---|---|---|---|---|---|
| Pia | - | | 0 | 0 | 4 | 0 | 0 | 11 | 0 | 0 | 0 | 0 | 2 | 0 | Winner | 17 |
| Ana Mari | 0 | 0 | 0 | 0 | 0 | 0 | 0 | 0 | 0 | 0 | 0 | 8 | 9 | 0 | Runner-Up | 17 |
| Tomaž | 0 | 0 | 2 | 5 | 10 | 0 | 0 | 0 | 0 | 0 | 0 | 0 | 0 | 0 | Runner-Up | 17 |
| Sebastjan B | 7 | 0 | 0 | 0 | 0 | 0 | 5 | 0 | 6 | 0 | 0 | 4 | 0 | 0 | Fourth Place | 22 |
| Ana H | 10 | 0 | 2 | 0 | 3 | 0 | 0 | 0 | 0 | 0 | 0 | 0 | 0 | 0 | Evicted | 15 |
| Mitja | Not in House | | | | | | | 0 | 0 | 0 | 0 | 0 | 0 | 0 | Evicted | 0 |
| Soraja | Not in House | | | | | | | | | | | 0 | 2 | 0 | Evicted | 2 |
| Suzana | Not in House | | | | | | | | | | | 0 | 2 | 0 | Evicted | 2 |
| Martin | Not in House | | | | | | | 0 | 0 | 0 | 6 | 4 | 2 | Evicted | | 12 |
| Vlado | Not in House | | | | | | | | | | | 0 | 16 | Evicted | | 16 |
| David | 0 | 0 | 2 | 0 | 4 | 9 | 0 | 13 | 0 | 6 | 11 | 11 | Evicted | | | 56 |
| Franc | Not in House | | | | | | | 0 | 13 | 12 | 13 | Evicted | | | | 38 |
| Tibor | 1 | 0 | 0 | 0 | 0 | 0 | 0 | 0 | 0 | 13 | Evicted | | | | | 14 |
| Ana J | Not in House | | | | | | | 0 | Walked | | | | | | | N/A |
| Nina | 1 | 0 | 16 | 2 | 4 | 10 | 11 | 18 | Evicted | | | | | | | 62 |
| Sebastjan Z | 1 | 0 | 16 | 4 | 4 | 0 | 14 | Evicted | | | | | | | | 38 |
| Darja | 0 | 0 | 2 | 4 | 1 | 14 | Evicted | | | | | | | | | 21 |
| Tina | - | | 14 | 3 | 0 | Walked | | | | | | | | | | 17 |
| Žiga | 3 | 0 | 8 | 4 | 6 | Evicted | | | | | | | | | | 21 |
| Marko | 4 | 0 | 8 | 12 | Evicted | | | | | | | | | | | 24 |
| Dijana | 1 | 0 | 14 | Evicted | | | | | | | | | | | | 15 |
| Ksenija | 4 | 0 | Evicted | | | | | | | | | | | | | 4 |

== Weekly task ==
| Week | Task | Results |
|---|---|---|
| 1 | Hotel Big Brother | Passed |
| 2 | The Elite | Passed |
| 3 | Pairs | Passed |
| 4 | Song Contest | Passed |
| 5 | Tour of Slovenia | Failed |
| 6 | Factory Jobs | Passed |
| 7 | Battle of the (Fake) Houses | Passed |
| 8 | Theatre | Passed |
| 9 | Crisis | Passed |
| 10 | Big Brother Radio | Failed |
| 11 | The Institute to employment | Passed |
| 12 | Wedding | Passed |
| 13 | | Passed |
| 14 | | Failed |

=== Hotel Big Brother status ===
As part of the first task of the season, some housemates would be "Guests" while others would be "Servants". Throughout the task housemates roles would change whenever Big Brother saw fit.

| Housemate | Day 3–5 | Day 6–7 |
|---|---|---|
| Ana | Guest | Guest |
| Ana Mari | Servant | Guest |
| Darja | Guest | Guest |
| David | Servant | Servant |
| Dijana | Guest | Guest |
| Ksenija | Servant | Servant |
| Marko | Guest | Servant |
| Nina | Guest | Servant |
| Pia | Secret Room | |
| Sebastjan B | Guest | Guest |
| Sebastjan Z | Servant | Guest |
| Tibor | Servant | Guest |
| Tina | Secret Room | |
| Tomaž | Secret Room | |
| Žiga | Guest | Servant |

- On Day 3, Ana Mari, David, Ksenija, Sebastjan Z., and Tibor automatically became servants when they volunteered to go to the diary room prior to the task announcement.
- On Day 6, a housemate shuffle occurred sending Ana Mari, Sebastian Z, and Tibor to the hotel as guests, while Marko, Nina, and Žiga became servants.

=== Pairs ===
In the third week of the competition the contestants competed in pairs. These pairs were chosen by the housemates. The final pairs would compete to become the "Ultimate Pair".

| Housemate 1 | Housemate 2 | New Partner |
|---|---|---|
| Dijana | Tina | |
| Ana | David | |
| Ana Mari | Sebastjan B | |
| Marko | Žiga | |
| Tomaž | Sebastjan Z | Darja |
| Darja | Nina | Sebastjan Z |

=== Singing competition results ===
In week 4 the housemates competed in a singing competition in order to earn immunity in week 5. Below are the results of the public vote.

| Housemates | Impersonating | Place |
|---|---|---|
| Ana Mari & Tina | Rihanna and Kanye West | 1st |
| Pia | Jennifer Lopez | 2nd |
| Žiga | Pink | 3rd |
| Ana & David | Blues Brothers | 4th |
| Nina | Magnifica | 5th |
| Darja, Sebastjan B, Tibor | Elton John, Axel Rosa, Freddie Mercury | 6th |
| Marko, Sebastjan Z, Tomaž | The Sisters | 7th |
