= Big Brother (Slovenian TV series) season 2 =

Big Brother
- Season 2
- Presented by: Nina Osenar; Matej Grm - Gusti
- No. of days: 92
- No. of housemates: 17
- Winner: Naske Mehić
- Runner-up: Sandi Medle

Release
- Original network: Kanal A
- Original release: 14 March – 14 June 2008

Series chronology
- ← Previous; Big Brother 1 Next → Big Brother Slavnih

Big Brother 2 ran for 92 days, starting on March 14, 2008, and ending on June 14, 2008. The host of the show was Nina Osenar. The prize was 92,000 Euro. This season the Big Brother house was divided into two sides the rich side and the poor side. There were thirteen housemates who entered the house on day one and four who entered at later dates. As an added twist this season two of the contestants (Tamara and Tjasa) were related. Also, Mateja who entered the house in week six was the girlfriend of housemate EITyeb. The winner of this season was Naske Mehić.

== Housemates ==
Housemates	Age	Residence	Entered	Exited	Status
Naske Mehić	23	Sevnica	Day 1	Day 93	Winner
Sandi Medle	22	Sela pri Ratežu	Day 1	Day 93	Runner-Up
Mateja Plavšič	23	Šmartno ob Paki	Day 35	Day 93	Third Place
Marcelo Knez	26	Vrh pri Boštanju	Day 1	Day 93	Fourth Place
Sara	19	Ljubljana	Day 1	Day 84	Evicted
Nejc Murko	21	Maribor	Day 49	Day 77	Evicted
ElTyeb Gruden	26	Koper	Day 1	Day 71	Evicted
Tea Daneu	22	Dutovlje	Day 49	Day 64	Evicted
Jeanine Čoh	21	Male Braslovče	Day 1	Day 57	Evicted
Saša Janežič	28	Šentjanž	Day 35	Day 50	Evicted
Sebastijan Lazar	35	Novo Mesto	Day 1	Day 45	Walked
Tjaša Slaček	19	Malečnik	Day 1	Day 42	Evicted
Dejan	25	Koper	Day 1	Day 39	Ejected
Marko	29	Ljubljana	Day 1	Day 35	Evicted
Dada Perić	24	Koper	Day 1	Day 29	Evicted
Damjana Zupan	35	Dramlje	Day 1	Day 21	Evicted
Tamara Slaček	24	Malečnik	Day 1	Day 14	Evicted

=== First Batch ===
The following housemates entered the house on Day 1.

==== Dada ====
Dada Perić is a 24-year-old from Koper, Slovenia. During her stay in the Big brother house Dada was never on the poor side of the house following the division of the house. Though she survived the first eviction Dada was not very well received by the public and was voted out with an overwhelming 67 percent of the vote when nominated against Sandi and Tjaša in the third eviction.

==== Tamara ====
Tamara Slaček is a 26-year-old from Malečnik, Maribor. During her stay in the house Tamara was seen as a creator of conflict amongst herself and her fellow housemates. She was nominated along with her sister and several other housemates during the first round of nominations and was evicted after receiving over 50 percent of the vote.

==== Sara ====
Sara is a 19-year-old from Ljubljana, Slovenia. During her stay in the Big brother house Sara was the only original female who managed to avoid being nominated early on in the show however towards the end of the show Sara was nominated four times and on her fourth time when she was nominated against Marcelo and Sandi, Sara received just over 50 percent of the vote and became the eleventh and final evictee of the season. Sara spent more time in the Big brother Slovenia house than any other female housemate in both seasons (84 days).

==== Sandi ====
Sandi Medle is a 22-year-old from Sela pri Ratežu, Slovenia. During his stay in the Big brother house Sandi started a relationship with Tjaša. Early on in the game Sandi found both himself and Tjaša up for nominations several times until in round five of nominations he found himself and Tjaša nominated against only each other (due to the ejection of Dejan). Following Tjašas eviction Sandi seemed to become the comedian of the house. Sandi was nominated a record breaking seven times and rarely came close to being evicted. While considered a favorite to win early on Sandi only managed to become the Runner up of Big brother Slovenia 2, losing to Naske.

==== Jeanine ====
Jeanine Čoh is a 21-year-old from Male Braslovče, Slovenia. Early on in her stay in the Big brother house Jeanine was nominated several times, first for what she did not know was a fake eviction which she survived and then she was nominated two more times soon after that. She survived her first two real evictions and for a little while managed to avoid being nominated, but in the eighth round of nominations she was nominated against newcomer Mateja and was evicted with 61 percent of the vote.

==== Marcelo ====
Marcelo Knez is a 26-year-old from Vrh pri Boštanju, Slovenia. While in the house Marcelo was rarely nominated for eviction and on the rare occasions when he was nominated he survived. Marcelo ultimately finished in fourth place.

==== Marko ====
Marko is a 29-year-old from Ljubljana, Slovenia. Early on his stay in the Big brother house Marko was nominated for what he did not know was a fake eviction. He was fake evicted and moved to the rich side of the house, after he was moved to the rich side of the house he was asked to choose six housemates he would like to have moved to the rich side with him, he chose Dada, EITyeb, Jeanine, Marcelo, Sara and Sandi to join him on the rich side. Marko managed to avoid being nominated until the fourth round of nominations when he was nominated against Jeanine and Tjaša. He was evicted with half of the public's vote making him the first male evictee of the season.

==== Damjana ====
Damjana Zupan is a 35-year-old from Dramlje, Slovenia. During her stay in the Big brother house Damjana was nominated in both the first and second round of nominations. Even though she was not poorly received by public when put up against the early favorite to win Sandi in the second round of nominations, Damjana was narrowly evicted with just 52 percent of the publics vote.

==== Sebastijan ====
Sebastijan Lazar is a 35-year-old from Novo Mesto, Slovenia. During his stay in the house Sebastijan was rarely nominated. He was finally nominated in the sixth round of nominations. Though it seemed like Sebastijan would survive the sixth eviction, the viewers never got to find out if he would because on day 44 Sebastijan voluntarily left the Big brother house because he was missing his family.

==== Naske ====
Naske Mehić is a 23-year-old from Sevnica, Slovenia. Early on in his stay in the Big brother house Naske was one of six of the original 13 housemates chosen to live on the poor side of the house. While almost everyone else in his group was either evicted early or left on their own accord Naske managed to avoid being nominated for most of the game. Naske was finally nominated in round six of nominations and survived. He was nominated again in round ten of nominations and again survived. While Naske was not an initial favorite to win as the season went on he became more and more popular with the viewers and eventually went on to win Big brother 2 Slovenia.

==== Dejan ====
Dejan is a 25-year-old from Koper, Slovenia. While in the Big brother house Dejan was only nominated once but the two people he was nominated against (Tjaša and Sandi) had both survived multiple evictions already. On day 38 Dejan was ejected after getting into a fight with Tjaša and slapping her and showing threatening behavior towards her.

==== Tjaša ====
Tjaša Slaček is a 19-year-old from Malečnik, Maribor. Tjaša entered on day one with her sister Tamara. Both she and her sister found themselves nominated in the first round of nominations and her sister Tamara was evicted. Following Tamaras eviction Tjaša grew much closer to fellow housemate Sandi. Tjaša was nominated again in the third, fourth, and fifth round of nominations (she was nominated against Sandi in two of the three) and was finally evicted in a head to head eviction against Sandi on day 42.

==== EITyeb ====
Eityeb Gruden is a 26-year-old from Koper, Slovenia. During his stay in the Big brother house Eityeb was only nominated once for eviction. On day 35 Eityebs girlfriend Mateja entered the house as a new housemate. The one time that Eityeb was nominated he was nominated against Mateja and evicted with 64 percent of the vote.

=== Second Batch ===
The following housemates entered the house on Day 35.

==== Mateja ====
Mateja is a 23-year-old from Šmartno ob Paki, Slovenia. Mateja entered the house on day 35 as a new housemate along with Saša. Upon her entrance into the house it was revealed that she was Eityebs girlfriend. Mateja found herself nominated several times while in the house and eventually found herself nominated for eviction head to head against Eityeb, which she survived. Mateja was the only non original housemate to do fairly well ultimately coming in third place.

==== Saša ====
Saša is a 28-year-old from Šentjanž who entered the house as a new housemate along with Mateja on day 35. Saša was the sixth evictee and left the house on day 49.

=== Third Batch ===
The following housemates entered the house on Day 49.

==== Nejc ====
Nejc is a 21-year-old who entered the house on day 49 as a new housemate, along with Tea. Nejc was the tenth evictee and left the house on day 77.

==== Tea ====
Tea is a 22-year-old who entered the house on day 49 as a new housemate, along with Nejc. Tea was the eighth evictee and left the house on day 64.

== Nominations table ==
	Week 1	Week 2	Week 3	Week 4	Week 5	Week 6	Week 7	Week 8	Week 9	Week 10	Week 11	Week 12	Week 13 Final	
Naske	Jeanine, Marko	Damjana, Tamara	Damjana, Marko	Sebastijan, Tjaša	Marko, Tjaša	Dejan, Tjaša	Saša, Mateja	Jeanine, Sara	Mateja, Tea	Sara, Nejc	Marcelo, Nejc	Sara, Sandi	Winner (Day 93)	
Sandi	Naske, Marko	Sara, Jeanine	Sara, Jeanine	Sara, Jeanine	Sara, Jeanine	Sara, Jeanine	Sara, Jeanine	Naske, Mateja	Sara, Nejc	Eityeb, Mateja	Sara, Nejc	Sara, Marcelo	Runner-up (Day 93)	
Mateja	Not in House					Exempt	Sebastijan, Saša	Jeanine, Marcelo	Naske, Tea	Sara, Nejc	Nejc, Sara	Sara, Sandi	Third place (Day 93)	
Marcelo	Jeanine, Marko	Dada, Sandi	Dada, Sandi	Dada, Sandi	Jeanine, Sandi	Eityeb, Sandi	Sandi, Sara	Mateja, Eityeb	Sara, Sandi	Eityeb, Mateja	Sandi, Nejc	Sara, Sandi	Fourth place (Day 93)	
Sara	Tamara, Tjaša	Dada, Sandi	Dada, Sandi	Eityeb, Sandi	Jeanine, Sandi	Jeanine, Sandi	Jeanine, Sandi	Eityeb, Mateja	Marcelo, Nejc	Eityeb, Mateja	Sandi, Nejc	Mateja, Sandi	Evicted (Day 85)	
Nejc	Not in House							Exempt	Sandi, Marcelo	Mateja, Eityeb	Marcelo, Sandi	Evicted (Day 78)		
Eltyeb	Jeanine, Marko	Marcelo, Marko	Sandi, Marcelo	Dada, Marcelo	Jeanine, Sara	Sandi, Jeanine	Sara, Jeanine	Jeanine, Marcelo	Tea, Naske	Nejc, Sara	Evicted (Day 71)			
Tea	Not in House							Exempt	Eityeb, Mateja	Evicted (Day 64)				
Jeanine	Tjaša, Marko	Dada, Sandi	Dada, Sandi	Dada, Sandi	Marcelo, Sandi	Sandi, Sara	Sandi, Sara	Naske, Mateja	Evicted (Day 57)					
Saša	Not in House					Exempt	Naske, Sebastijan	Evicted (Day 50)						
Sebastijan	Naske, Marko	Tamara, Tjaša	Damjana, Tjaša	Marko, Tjaša	Marko, Tjaša	Dejan, Tjaša	Saša, Mateja	Walked (Day 45)						
Tjaša	Dejan, Marko	Damjana, Sebastijan	Marko, Sebastijan	Marko, Sebastijan	Marko, Sebastijan	Naske, Dejan	Evicted (Day 43)							
Dejan	Damjana, Marko	Damjana, Tjaša	Damjana, Tjaša	Sebastijan, Tjaša	Marko, Tjaša	Naske, Tjaša	Ejected (Day 39)							
Marko	Tjaša, Jeanine	Eityeb, Jeanine	Damjana, Sebastijan	Sebastijan, Tjaša	Sebastijan, Tjaša	Evicted (Day 35)								
Dada	Jeanine, Marko	Sara, Jeanine	Sara, Jeanine	Sara, Jeanine	Evicted (Day 29)									
Damjana	Tamara, Marko	Tamara, Tjaša	Marko, Sebastijan	Evicted (Day 21)										
Tamara	Damjana, Marko	Dejan, Sebastijan	Evicted (Day 14)											
Notes	1	2	2	2	2	2	2, 3	4	2	5	5, 6	5, 7	8	
Up for eviction	Jeanine; Marko	Dada; Damjana; Jeanine; Sandi; Tamara; Tjaša	Damjana; Sandi	Dada; Sandi; Tjaša	Jeanine; Marko; Tjaša	~~Dejan~~; Sandi; Tjaša	Naske; Sara; Saša; ~~Sebastijan~~	Jeanine; Mateja	Marcelo; Nejc; Sandi; Sara; Tea	Eityeb; Mateja	Naske; Nejc; Sandi; Sara	Marcelo; Sandi; Sara	All housemates	
Walked	none						Sebastijan	none						
Ejected	none					Dejan	none							
Evicted	Marko; 81% to move	Tamara; 69% to evict	Damjana; 52% to evict	Dada; 67% to evict	Marko; 50% to evict	Tjaša; 61% to evict	Saša; 51% to evict	Jeanine; 61% to evict	Tea; 51% to evict	Eityeb; 64% to evict	Nejc; 76% to evict	Sara; 51% to evict	Marcelo; Fewest votes to win	Mateja; Fewest votes to win
Evicted	Marko; 81% to move	Tamara; 69% to evict	Damjana; 52% to evict	Dada; 67% to evict	Marko; 50% to evict	Tjaša; 61% to evict	Saša; 51% to evict	Jeanine; 61% to evict	Tea; 51% to evict	Eityeb; 64% to evict	Nejc; 76% to evict	Sara; 51% to evict	Sandi; Fewest votes to win	
Survived	Jeanine; 19%	Tjaša; 11% Damjana; 9% Sandi; 4% Jeanine; 4% Dada; 3%	Sandi; 48%	Sandi; 21% Tjaša; 12%	Jeanine; 42% Tjaša; 8%	Sandi; 39%	Sara; 33% Naske; 16%	Mateja; 39%	Sara; 24% Nejc; 11% Marcelo; 11% Sandi; 3%	Mateja; 36%	Sara; 14% Sandi; 6% Naske; 4%	Marcelo; 37% Sandi; 12%	Naske; Most votes to win	

Housemates living on the rich side of the house
Housemates living on the poor side of the house
Automatically nominated due to rule breaking

- In week one Marko was fake evicted to the rich side of the house. Soon after he had to choose six other housemates to join him on the rich side of the house. The housemates he chose were Dada, Eityeb, Jeanine, Marcelo, Sandi, and Sara.
- In weeks two through seven and week nine housemates could only nominate other housemates living on the same side of the house as them.
- In week seven both Naske and Sebastijan were put up for eviction by big brother for rule breaking.
- In week eight housemates could only nominate housemates living on the other side of the house.
- In week ten the two sides of the house merged and housemates could nominate any other housemate.
- In week eleven both Naske and Sara were put up for eviction by big brother for rule breaking.
- In week twelve Marcelo was put up for eviction by big brother for rule breaking.
- In week thirteen the public voted for the housemate they wanted to see win.

== House Divide ==
	Week 1	Week 2	Week 3	Week 4	Week 5	Week 6	Week 7	Week 8	Week 9
Naske	Poor	Poor	Poor	Poor	Rich	Poor	Rich	Rich	Rich
Sandi	Poor	Rich	Rich	Rich	Poor	Rich	Poor	Poor	Poor
Mateja	NIH					Poor	Rich	Rich	Rich
Marcelo	Poor	Rich	Rich	Rich	Poor	Rich	Poor	Poor	Poor
Sara	Poor	Rich	Rich	Rich	Poor	Rich	Poor	Poor	Poor
Nejc	NIH							Poor	Poor
Eltyeb	Poor	Rich	Rich	Rich	Poor	Rich	Poor	Rich	Rich
Tea	NIH							Rich	Rich
Jeanine	Poor	Rich	Rich	Rich	Poor	Rich	Poor	Poor	Evicted
Saša	NIH					Rich	Rich	Evicted	
Sebastijan	Poor	Poor	Poor	Poor	Rich	Poor	Rich	Walked	
Tjaša	Poor	Poor	Poor	Poor	Rich	Poor	Evicted		
Dejan	Poor	Poor	Poor	Poor	Rich	Poor	Ejected		
Marko	Poor	Rich	Poor	Poor	Rich	Evicted			
Dada	Poor	Rich	Rich	Rich	Evicted				
Damjana	Poor	Poor	Poor	Evicted					
Tamara	Poor	Poor	Evicted						

Housemates living on the rich side of the house
Housemates living on the poor side of the house
