= Big Brother 2007 =

Big Brother 2007 may refer to:

- Big Brother (British TV series) series 8
- Big Brother 8 (American season)
- Big Brother (Australian TV series) season 7
- Big Brother 2007 (Finland)
- Big Brother (Slovenia)
- Big Brother Brasil 7, the seventh season of Big Brother Brazil
- Big Brother Germany 7, the seventh season of Big Brother Germany
- Celebrity Big Brother (British TV series) series 5
- Bigg Boss (Hindi season 1), the 2006–2007 edition of Big Brother in India
- Grande Fratello 7, the seventh season of Grande Fratello
- Pinoy Big Brother (season 2)
- Pinoy Big Brother: Celebrity Edition 2
- VIP Brother 2 (Bulgaria)
- Veliki brat 2, the second season of Veliki brat
