= Kanal A =

Slovenian national TV channel

- Country: Slovenia

Ownership
- Owner: Pro Plus d.o.o. (CME)
- Sister channels: POP TV, KINO, BRIO, OTO

History
- Launched: 16 May 1991

Links
- Website: Official web page

Kanal A is the first Slovenian commercial television station. The channel, which operates within PRO PLUS d.o.o., has national coverage. Its primary target group are viewers 18–49 years.

Viewers can watch news on Svet, which is broadcast on working days. Kanal A is home of sport as UEFA Champions League games are being broadcast on the channel, while sports fans can also enjoy MotoGP and Moto2 races as well as variety of other sports. Channel offers different TV series and movies.

== History ==
Viewers have been able to watch Kanal A since 16 May 1991. It was a completely new element on the Slovenian television market and at the time, the first independent television station on the territory of former Yugoslavia. The channel, however, started off with problems, such as a limited starting capital and the lack of funding necessary for proper national programming. Development accelerated with the entrance of SBS (1997), which enabled development of fast television technologies and internet.

On 23 October 2000 Kanal A merged with PRO PLUS d.o.o. The programming scheme was changed and Kanal A now offers even wider and complementary selection of contents to POP TV. On 1 October 2001, the first news magazine program called Extra was launched (forerunner of Extra Magazine) and also a modern and urban weather forecast Meteor with foreign Slovenian-speaking hosts. Kanal A sets the glamour trends with Oscars (March 2001) and from May 2001, six years in a row, also with the beauty contests; Slovenia Miss Universe and Miss Universe World. In May 2002, Kanal A offered exclusive coverage for Slovenian territory of the World Football Championship in Japan and in June 2006 one-half (32) of the matches of the World Football Championship in Germany.

On 27 March 2002 Kanal A launched the first reality show in Slovenia – Popstars, and one year later the second version of that music Odyssey. The music groups Bepop and Unique were born on Kanal A. Younger audiences were also able to enjoy the music show Non-Stop Music from March 2004 to the end of August 2004 the show E+, which presents »All you Need for Life«. Kanal A also offered the shows Katarina (2007), TV Tuba (2008), Svingerji (2008), Zvezda pokra (2010), etc. In February 2007, news programme Svet was launched as the first news show on Kanal A.

== Achievements ==
- Viktors 2002 (2003) – Viktor for special achievements for Popstars project (first reality show in Slovenia)
- Viktors 2005 (2006) – Viktor for best television show E+
- Viktors 2006 (2007) – Viktor for special achievements for coverage of the World Football Championship in Germany
- Viktors 2007 (2008) – Viktor for promising media personality for Lili Žagar, anchor of the program The World, Viktor for television personality was awarded to Marko Potrč, anchor of the program SVET
- Viktors 2008 (2009) – Bojan Traven (Viktor for special achievements)

== Program ==
In its domestic production Kanal A offers its viewers news and entertaining contents. The program is rich with numerous foreign hits—films, series. The news program Svet on Kanal A is broadcast on working days at 18.00 and at 19.45 and is followed by a short summary including the latest news. The creators of the program form their stories on the basis of live television. The editorial policy is on the side of the ordinary man with a focus on the so-called citizen journalism—the viewers can participate in the show and send their photos or videos.

== Current programming ==
=== Nationally created shows (fragment) ===
Original name	Format
Svet	daily news
Volan	car magazine show
Magazin Lige Prvakov	UEFA Champions League magazine
Magazin Lige Europa	UEFA Europa League magazine

=== Internationally created series ===
Original name	Slovenian name	Country
The Finder	Nezmotljivi čut	US
The Goldbergs	Goldbergovi	US
Arrow	Puščica	US
The Guardian	Odvetnik z ulice	US
Kud puklo da puklo	Kar bo pa bo	Croatia
Alarm for Cobra 11	Alarm za Kobro 11	Germany
Raising Hope	Vzgoja za začetnike	US
The Big Bang Theory	Veliki pokovci	US
How I Met Your Mother	Kako sem spoznal vajino mamo	US
Powder Park	Snowboarderji	Germany
Boardwalk Empire	Imperij pregrehe	US

== Past programming ==
=== Nationally created shows ===
==== Reality shows ====
Show	English translation	Original version	Seasons	Format	Aired	Presenter(s)	Note
Big Brother	Big Brother	Big Brother	4	reality show	2007(1); 2008(2); 2015(3); 2016(4)	Nina Osenar (1-2); Ana Marija Mitič (3); Manja Stević (4)	one celebrity season of the show aired on Kanal A's sister channel POP TV, called Big Brother Slavnih
Dirka	The Race	original format	1	racing reality show	2006	Maja Rejec; Dani Bavec	/
Popstars	Popstars	Popstars	2	singing reality show	2002(1); 2003(2)	?	The winning group of the first season - Bepop, became an instant sensation, and their first album called "Bodi zvezda", became one of the best-selling albums of all time in Slovenia

==== Game shows ====
Show	English translation	Original version	Seasons	Format	Aired	Presenter(s)	Note
Mladoporočenca	Newlyweds	Newlyweds	?	quiz game show	2001-?	Sandi Salkič	/
Življenjska priložnost	Opportunity Of Your Life	The $1,000,000 Chance of a Lifetime	?	quiz show	2000-2002	Mito Trefalt / Borut Veselko	/

==== News / tabloid shows ====
Show	English translation	Seasons	Format	Aired	Presenter(s)	Note
Svet: Povečava	World: Zoom In	/	news/documentary debate show	2011-2013	Kristina Hacin, Mirko Mayer, Marko Milenkovič, Jure Tepina, Urša Žgajnar, Andrej Peroša, Blaž Jarc	/
E+	E Plus	/	popular culture news talk show	2004-2006	Jelena Kovačevič, Boštjan Kljun, Damjana Bakarič, sisters Polona & Špela Jambrek, and others	/
Meteor	Meteor	/	weather broadcast	2001-?	Inacio, Ingri, Laris, Mahmud, Zhang	show was hosted in Slovene by five foreign people to which the Slovenian language is not their mother language
Ekstra Ekstra magazin	Extra / Extra Magazine	/	tabloid news magazine	2001-2006	Alenka Vidic, Anja Tomažin, sisters Polona & Špela Jambrek	/

==== Comedy shows ====
Show	English translation	Seasons	Format	Aired	Presenter(s)	Note
TV Tuba	TV Tuba	4	show about viral videos on the web	2008-2010	Sanja Grohar	/
Pazi, kamera!	Watch Out, Camera!	13	hidden camera show	2003–present	Helena Lovše (2003-2007); Dijana Galič (2007–present)	/

==== Magazines ====
Show	English translation	Seasons	Format	Aired	Presenter(s)	Note
Avto.info	Auto.Info	3	car magazine	2010-2011	Matej Mihinjač	/
Avtosteron	Autosteron	1	car magazine	2009	Urška Mrak; Žiga Colja	/
Navigator	Navigator	?	nautic magazine	2005-2007	Taiji Tokuhisa	/

==== Sport shows ====
Show	English translation	Seasons	Format	Aired	Presenter(s)	Note
Zvezda pokra	Poker Star	1	poker show	2010	Peter Poles; Dani Bavec	/
ŠKL	School Basketball League	6	sports show	2010–present	various presenters	previously aired on Kanal A's sister channel POP TV
Gremo na smuči	Let's Go Skiing	1	skiing show for youth	2009	Jernej Kuntner; Tina Uršič; Urban Simčič	/
Nogometna Arena	Football Arena	2	sport talk show for FIFA World Cup 2002 & 2006	2002; 2006	various presenters	/

==== Music shows ====
Show	English translation	Seasons	Format	Aired	Presenter(s)	Note
Non stop music	Non Stop Music	?	music show	2004-2006	?	/
Atlantis	Atlantis	?	music show	in the 1990s	Oriana Girotto; Katarina Čas; Vojko Kersan	/
Žametne vrtnice	Velvet Roses	?	polka music show	in the 1990s	Boris Kopitar	/
Helena	Helena	?	polka music show	in the 1990s	Helena Blagne	/
Magnetoskop	The Recorder	?	rock music show	in the 1990s	Nina Gajič; Sonja Javornik	/
Videogrom	Videothunder	?	music show	in the 1990s	Anja Rupel	/

==== Call TV ====
Show	English translation	Seasons	Format	Aired	Presenter(s)	Note
Srečni klic	Lucky Call	/	call TV quiz	2014-?	various presenters	/
Evromanija / Euromanija	Euromania	/	call TV quiz	2010-2011	various presenters	/
Astro TV	Astro TV	/	astrology call show	2010-?	various presenters	/
Srečna linija	Lucky Line	/	call TV quiz	2007-2009	various presenters	/

==== Other shows ====
- Ljubo doma! (show similar to Extreme Makeover: Home Edition)
  - 2009
- Katarina (talk show similar to The Oprah Winfrey Show)
  - 2007
- Problem (comedy show)
  - 2003
- Mozaik Slovenije (documentary show)
  - 2001
- Zmenkarije (dating show)
  - in the 1990s and early 2000s
- Komedija zmešnjav (comedy show)
  - in the 1990s and early 2000s
- Odklop (comedy stunts show)
  - in the 1990s
- Adrenalin (comedy stunts show)
  - in the 1990s
- Aktivno! (talk show)
  - in the 1990s
- Lepota telesa (show about fashion)
  - in the 1990s
- Stilski izziv (show similar to Extreme Makeover)
  - in the 1990s
- Modna dežela (show about fashion)
  - in the 1990s
- Ob 20:00 si na Kanalu A priglejte (talk show)
  - in the 1990s
- Klik (talk show)
  - in the 1990s
- Imamo jih radi (talk show about pets)
  - in the 1990s
- Dance Session (dance show)
  - in the 1990s
- Moj film (talk show)
  - in the 1990s
- Dobro jutro (morning talk show)
  - in the 1990s
- Zajček dolgoušček (morning kids cartoon and talk show)
  - in the 1990s
- Kaličopko (morning kids cartoon and talk show)
  - in the 1990s
- Na piki imamo (news magazine)
  - in the 1990s
- Danijeve Zvezde (Astro show)
  - 1992–2006

==== Series ====
Title	English translation	Genre	Seasons	Aired	Note
Svingerji	Swingers	sitcom	1	2008	/

== See also ==
- Pro Plus d.o.o.
- POP TV
- BRIO
