= School Basketball League =

Logo of the School Basketball League

The School Basketball League (Slovene: 'Šolska košarkarska liga'; ŠKL) is a school sports league in Slovenia. It is a primary school and high school project, launched in the school year of 1995–1996. It is based on competitions in basketball, volleyball, soccer, dodgeball, dance, cheerleading and acrobatic cheering.

Slovenian minister of education Milan Zver and CEO of Zavod ŠKL Vojko Korošec presenting the trophy to primary school winners

There is a competition in the primary and high schools for ŠKL champion, which works under the guidance of school appointed mentors or external mentors from different sports clubs, and aided by sports schools. Boys and girls are equally included in the competition. There is a competition for the ŠKL champion in dance, cheerleading and acrobatic cheering groups from the primary and high schools, under the guidance of the appointed mentors. The competitions start with singing of the Slovene national anthem and the ŠKL anthem, followed by a presentation of the participants and the game, which is played in accordance with the rules of basketball. The dance, cheerleading and acrobatic cheering groups perform during the breaks, along with other activities such as games for prizes supported by sponsors. Young organizers, referees, secretaries, journalists, photographers, designers, members of video, computing and music clubs compete together within their respective project clubs.

There is an ŠKL newspaper, Ekipa, which issues 10,000 copies. Participants in the final event are covered live on the television channel Kanal A.

The principal target group presents young people between the ages of 10 and 20 however, individuals participating in the project are also younger (especially in design clubs) and older (mentors, parents, supporters, etc.).

The competition is financed by funds from business partners and other supporters. Zavod ŠKL Ljubljana finances the organization and activity of the system and events, including costs of media production and over 100 co-workers.
