= Big Brother (Slovenian TV series) season 4 =

Big Brother
- Season 4
- Presented by: Manja Plešnar
- No. of days: 104
- No. of housemates: 23
- Winner: Mirela Lapanović
- Runner-up: Klemen Podvržen

Release
- Original network: Kanal A
- Original release: 26 February – 9 June 2016

Season chronology
- ← Previous; Big Brother 3

Big Brother Slovenija 2016 is the fourth main season of the Slovenian version of Big Brother, which is broadcast on Kanal A. This season launched on Friday 26 February 2016. The host of the show this season is Manja Plešnar. The prize will be €50,000. This season's Big Brother house is located in Vevče, Ljubljana, Slovenia.

This Season was won by 39-year-old Mirela Lapanović.

== Housemates ==
Name	Age	Occupation	Residence	Status
Mirela Lapanović	39	Nurse	Novo Mesto	Winner
Klemen Podvržen	26	Miner. Firefighter	Zabukovica	Runner-Up
Erik Konig	27	Tennis Coach	Koper	Third place
Jasmin Ceriċ	20	Constructor	Kočevje	Fourth place
Dragan Stjepanović	25	N/A	Ravne na Koroškem	Fifth Place
Alen Jovanovič	26	Brizgalec	Mirna	17th Evicted
Jadranka Lisjak	44	Cook	Dutovlje	16th Evicted
Simon Kostanjšek	25	Entrepreneur	Kranj	15th Evicted
Alma Pijuković	20	Nurse	Velenje	14th Evicted
Polona Filipič	30	Beautician	Vinski Vrh	13th Evicted
Anže Nučič	22	Student	Ljubljana	Walked
Masa Levačič	20	Veterinarian	Hrastnik	12th Evicted
Saša Dobraš	39	Hairdresser	Slovenj Gradec	11th Evicted
Dalibor Brajdić	24	Roma Coordinator, Mediator	Novo Mesto	10th Evicted
Gregor Kobale	24	Fashion Consultant	Ljubljana	9th Evicted
Marko Jovanović	20	Sailor	Piran	8th Evicted
Filip Erhatič	25	Farmer	Osluševci	7th Evicted
Tugomir Kočevar	57	Graphic Designer, Senior Administrative Officer	Ljubljana	6th Evicted
Alenka Berzovšek	40	Interpreter	Celje	5th Evicted
Tamara Sobotič	25	Waitress	Slovenska Bistrica	4th Evicted
Alen Andrić	34	Economist	Ljubljana	3rd Evicted
Adnan Buljbašić	27	Clerk	Velenje	2nd Evicted
Diana Savski	23	Saleswoman	Poljčane	1st Evicted

== Nominations table ==
The first housemate in each box was nominated for two points, and the second housemate was nominated for one point.

	Week 1	Week 2	Week 3	Week 4	Week 5	Week 6	Week 7	Week 8	Week 9		Week 10	Week 11	Week 12	Week 13		Week 14	Week 15		
	Week 1	Week 2	Week 3	Week 4	Week 5	Week 6	Week 7	Week 8	Day 58	Day 65	Week 10	Week 11	Week 12	Day 85	Day 92	Week 14	Day 102	Final	
Mirela	No; Nominations	No; Nominations	Maša; Alma	Alen A. Alma	Filip; Erik	Klemen	No; Nominations	Erik; Alma	Jadranka; Maša	No; Nominations	Alma; Jasmin	Maša	Polona; Alma	Dragan; Jadranka	Dragan; Simon	Simon; Jasmin	No; Nominations	Winner (Day 104)	
Klemen	No; Nominations	No; Nominations	Not; Eligible	Alen A. Marko	Erik; Dalibor	Filip	No; Nominations	Erik; Jadranka	Jadranka; Maša	No; Nominations	Jadranka	Alma	Erik; ~~Anže~~; Dragan	Dragan; Alen J.	Dragan; Erik	Alen J. Jadranka; Erik	No; Nominations	Runner-Up (Day 104)	
Erik	No; Nominations	No; Nominations	Not; Eligible	Alma; Alen A.	Dalibor; Alma	No; Nominations	No; Nominations	Marko; Mirela	Mirela; Jasmin	No; Nominations	Saša; Klemen	No; Nominations	Simon; Dragan	Banned	Dragan; Simon	Simon; Mirela	No; Nominations	Third place (Day 104)	
Jasmin	Secret; Room			4-Alen A. 2-Dalibor	Dalibor; Tamara	Klemen	No; Nominations	Mirela; Marko	Mirela; Jadranka	No; Nominations	Saša; Klemen	Anže	~~Anže~~; Dragan; Mirela	Banned	Dragan; Jadranka	Simon; Jadranka	No; Nominations	Fourth place (Day 104)	
Dragan	Not in House								Mirela; Alma	Secret; Room	Maša	No; Nominations	~~Maša~~; Erik; Jadranka	Jadranka; Mirela	Erik; Jadranka	Erik	No; Nominations	Fifth place (Day 104)	
Alen J.	Not in House					Secret; Room	No; Nominations	Marko; Mirela	Jadranka; Mirela	No; Nominations	Klemen; Saša	Maša	~~Anže~~; Jadranka; Dragan	Dragan; Mirela	Jadranka; Dragan	Jadranka; Jasmin	No; Nominations	Evicted (Day 102)	
Jadranka	Secret; Room			4-Alen A. 2-Dalibor	Dalibor; Maša	No; Nominations	No; Nominations	Mirela; Marko	Mirela; Jasmin	No; Nominations	Klemen; Saša	No; Nominations	Dragan; ~~Anže~~; Polona	Dragan; Alen J.	Dragan; Simon	Simon; Jasmin	No; Nominations	Evicted (Day 102)	
Simon	Not in House					Secret; Room	No; Nominations	Mirela; Marko	Jadranka; Mirela	No; Nominations	Alma; Jasmin	No; Nominations	Erik; Dragan	Dragan; Mirela	Jadranka; Erik	Jadranka; Erik	Evicted (Day 99)		
Alma	No; Nominations	No; Nominations	Maša; Alenka	3-Tamara; 1-Erik	2-Tamara; 2-Maša	No; Nominations	No; Nominations	3-Mirela; 1-Marko	3-Mirela; 1-Jadranka	No; Nominations	2-Klemen; 2-Saša	No; Nominations	2-Dragan; 2-Mirela	Banned	Evicted (Day 92)				
Polona	Not in House								Mirela; Alma	Secret; Room	Mirela	Erik	Mirela; Erik	Evicted (Day 85)					
Anže	Not in House								Secret; Room	Secret; Room	Erik	No; Nominations	~~Erik~~; ~~Maša~~	Walked (Day 79)					
Maša	No; Nominations	No; Nominations	Alma; Alenka	Alma; Alen A.	Alenka; Alma	Klemen	No; Nominations	Marko; Mirela	Mirela; Jasmin	No; Nominations	Klemen; Saša	No; Nominations	~~Dragan~~; ~~Mirela~~	Evicted (Day 78)					
Saša	Not in House							Exempt	Mirela; Jasmin	No; Nominations	Jasmin; Alma	Evicted (Day 71)							
Dalibor	No; Nominations	No; Nominations	Not; Eligible	Erik; Tamara	Erik; Tamara	No; Nominations	No; Nominations	No; Nominations	Alma; Jasmin	No; Nominations	Evicted (Day 65)								
Gregor	Secret; Room			4-Alen A. 2-Dalibor	Dalibor; Alma	No; Nominations	No; Nominations	Mirela; Jadranka	Jadranka; Mirela	Evicted (Day 64)									
Marko	No; Nominations	No; Nominations	Not; Eligible	Alen A. Alma	Filip; Alma	No; Nominations	No; Nominations	Erik; Alma	Evicted (Day 58)										
Filip	No; Nominations	No; Nominations	Not; Eligible	Alen A. Maša	Alma; Marko	Klemen	No; Nominations	Evicted (Day 51)											
Tugomir	Secret; Room			4-Alen A. 2-Dalibor	Dalibor; Filip	No; Nominations	Evicted (Day 44)												
Alenka	No; Nominations	No; Nominations	Maša; Alma	Alen A. Tamara	Tamara; Maša	Klemen	Evicted (Day 44)												
Tamara	No; Nominations	No; Nominations	Alenka; Maša	Alen A. Alma	Alma; Dalibor	Evicted (Day 37)													
Alen A.	No; Nominations	No; Nominations	Not; Eligible	Tamara; Erik	Evicted (Day 30)														
Adnan	No; Nominations	No; Nominations	Not; Eligible	Evicted (Day 23)															
Diana	No; Nominations	No; Nominations	Evicted (Day 16)																
Notes	1, 2	3	4	5, 6, 7	7	8	9	7,10	7,11	none			12	13, 14	none	15	16		
Nominated	Adnan; Marko	Alenka; Alma; Diana; Maša; Mirela; Tamara	Adnan; Alen A. Dalibor; Erik; Filip; Klemen; Marko; Maša	Alma; Alen A. Klemen; Tamara	Alma; Dalibor; Klemen; Tamara	Alenka; Filip; Gregor; Jadranka; Jasmin; Maša; Mirela; Tugomir	Dalibor; Filip; Gregor; Jasmin; Klemen; Marko	Dalibor; Erik; Klemen; Marko; Mirela	Dalibor; Erik; Gregor; Jadranka; Klemen; Mirela	Alma; Dalibor; Erik; Jadranka; Jasmin; Maša; Mirela	Erik; Jadranka; Klemen; Maša; Mirela; Saša	Alma; Anže; Erik; Maša	Dragan; Erik; Jadranka; Mirela; Polona	Alma; Dragan; Erik; Jadranka; Jasmin; Mirela	none	~~Jadranka~~; ~~Jasmin~~; Erik; Klemen; Simon	All; Housemates		
Walked	none												Anže	none					
Evicted	Marko; 3 of 4 votes to save	Diana; Fewest votes to save	Adnan; Fewest votes to save	Alen A. Fewest votes to save	Tamara; Fewest votes to save	Alenka; Fewest votes to save	Filip; Fewest votes to save	Marko; Fewest votes to save	Gregor; Fewest votes to save	Dalibor; Fewest votes to save	Saša; Fewest votes to save	Maša; Fewest votes to save	Polona; Fewest votes to save	Alma; Fewest votes to save	Dragan; 11 of 24 points to fake evict	Simon; Fewest votes to save	Jadranka; Fewest votes to win	Dragan; Fewest votes to win	Jasmin; Fewest votes to win
Evicted	Marko; 3 of 4 votes to save	Diana; Fewest votes to save	Adnan; Fewest votes to save	Alen A. Fewest votes to save	Tamara; Fewest votes to save	Alenka; Fewest votes to save	Filip; Fewest votes to save	Marko; Fewest votes to save	Gregor; Fewest votes to save	Dalibor; Fewest votes to save	Saša; Fewest votes to save	Maša; Fewest votes to save	Polona; Fewest votes to save	Alma; Fewest votes to save	Dragan; 11 of 24 points to fake evict	Simon; Fewest votes to save	Jadranka; Fewest votes to win	Erik; Fewest votes to win	Klemen; Fewest votes to win
Evicted	Marko; 3 of 4 votes to save	Diana; Fewest votes to save	Adnan; Fewest votes to save	Alen A. Fewest votes to save	Tamara; Fewest votes to save	Tugomir; Fewest votes to save	Filip; Fewest votes to save	Marko; Fewest votes to save	Gregor; Fewest votes to save	Dalibor; Fewest votes to save	Saša; Fewest votes to save	Maša; Fewest votes to save	Polona; Fewest votes to save	Alma; Fewest votes to save	Dragan; 11 of 24 points to fake evict	Simon; Fewest votes to save	Alen J. Fewest votes to win	Erik; Fewest votes to win	Klemen; Fewest votes to win
Evicted	Marko; 3 of 4 votes to save	Diana; Fewest votes to save	Adnan; Fewest votes to save	Alen A. Fewest votes to save	Tamara; Fewest votes to save	Tugomir; Fewest votes to save	Filip; Fewest votes to save	Marko; Fewest votes to save	Gregor; Fewest votes to save	Dalibor; Fewest votes to save	Saša; Fewest votes to save	Maša; Fewest votes to save	Polona; Fewest votes to save	Alma; Fewest votes to save	Dragan; 11 of 24 points to fake evict	Simon; Fewest votes to save	Alen J. Fewest votes to win	Mirela; Most votes to win	

=== Notes ===
This housemate was in the Secret Room.
This housemate was immune from eviction.
This housemate was automatically put up for eviction by Big Brother.

- ^1 : On launch night, Gregor, Jadranka, Jasmin and Tugomir were entered the secret room, they have to pretend they are a family.
- ^2 : This week, all the male housemates were competing for the golden pass. Adnan and Marko were the last two without a pass. Big Brother decided that Marko would not receive a pass and his fate was left to the secret room housemates. Gregor was the only one who wanted to evict Marko so he was saved.
- ^3 : This week, all the female housemates had to discover male housemates' secrets to win immunities. But they failed, Alenka, Alma, Diana, Masa, Mirela, Tamara are nominated.
- ^4 : This week, all the male housemates were nominated, and the female housemates voted for one of them to join in nomination with male housemates.
- ^5 : Last Wednesday, Gregor moved to the main house. On Saturday during live show, Jasmin, Jadranka and Tugomir moved to the main house, they still have to pretend they are a real family.
- ^6 : The family nominated together and counted as one. They have double points.
- ^7 : Alma have one addition points.
- ^8 : Losing team of the week is voted in who gets immunity.
- ^9 : This week, all the male housemates except Alen J. and Simon were nominated
- ^10 : This week, new housemate Simona has been exempted nominated.
- ^11 : Polona and Dragan nominated together and counted as one.
- ^12 : This week's nomination were held on last Wednesday, before Maša was evicted on Saturday. And Anže decided to leave the house on Sunday. Therefore, nominations for Maša and Anže are voided. On Sunday, housemate who nominated Maša and Anže, are required for give a replacement nomination.
- ^13 : Alma, Erik and Jasmine are nominated for violated the rules of the house. They are also banned for nominate.
- ^14 : For the victory in the weekly task, the Big Brother Talent show, Alen had earned -2 points power, and Simon had earned immunity.
- ^15 : This week, housemates nominate from pairs. Each pair has two housemates, there are three pairs in total. Housemates must nominate one housemate from each pair. Blue name indicate Alen J. or Simon. Green name indicate Mirela or Jadranka. Red name indicate Jasmin or Erik. But the final decision rested with Dragon. He decided: Simon remains nominated; Nominations for Mirela and Jadranka are cancelled; He nominated Erik, so Jasmin is saved.

=== Total Nominations Received ===
	Week 1	Week 2	Week 3	Week 4	Week 5	Week 6	Week 7	Week 8	Week 9	Week 10	Week 11	Week 12	Week 13		Week 14	Week 15	Total
Mirela	-	-	-	-	-	-	-	14	18	1	-	5	3	0	~~1~~	Winner	41
Klemen	-	-	-	-	-	-	-	-	-	10	-	0	0	0	0	Runner-Up	10
Erik	-	-	-	4	5	-	-	6	-	1	1	7	-	4	3	Third place	31
Jasmin	-			0	0	-	-	0	5	4	-	0	-	0	3	Fourth place	12
Dragan	Not in House								-	-	-	10	10	11	-	Fifth place	31
Alen J.	Not in House					-	-	-	-	-	-	0	2-2	0	1	Evicted	1
Jadranka	-			0	0	-	-	2	12	1	-	3	3	6	~~4~~	Evicted	27
Simon	Not in House					-	-	-	-	-	-	2	-	3	4	Evicted	9
Alma	-	-	4	7	8	-	-	2	3	5	1	1	-	Evicted			30
Polona	Not in House								-	-	-	3	Evicted				0
Anže	Not in House								-	-	1	~~6~~	Walked				1
Maša	-	-	7	1	4	-	-	0	2	1	2	~~2~~	Evicted				17
Saša	Not in House							-	-	9	Evicted						9
Dalibor	-	-	-	2	12	-	-	-	-	Evicted							14
Gregor	-			0	0	-	-	0	-	Evicted							0
Marko	-	-	-	1	1	-	-	10	Evicted								12
Filip	-	-	-	0	5	-	-	Evicted									5
Tugomir	-			0	0	-	Evicted										0
Alenka	-	-	4	0	2	-	Evicted										6
Tamara	-	-	0	7	6	Evicted											13
Alen A.	-	-	-	16	Evicted												16
Adnan	-	-	-	Evicted													0
Diana	-	-	Evicted														0
