= Dramlja =

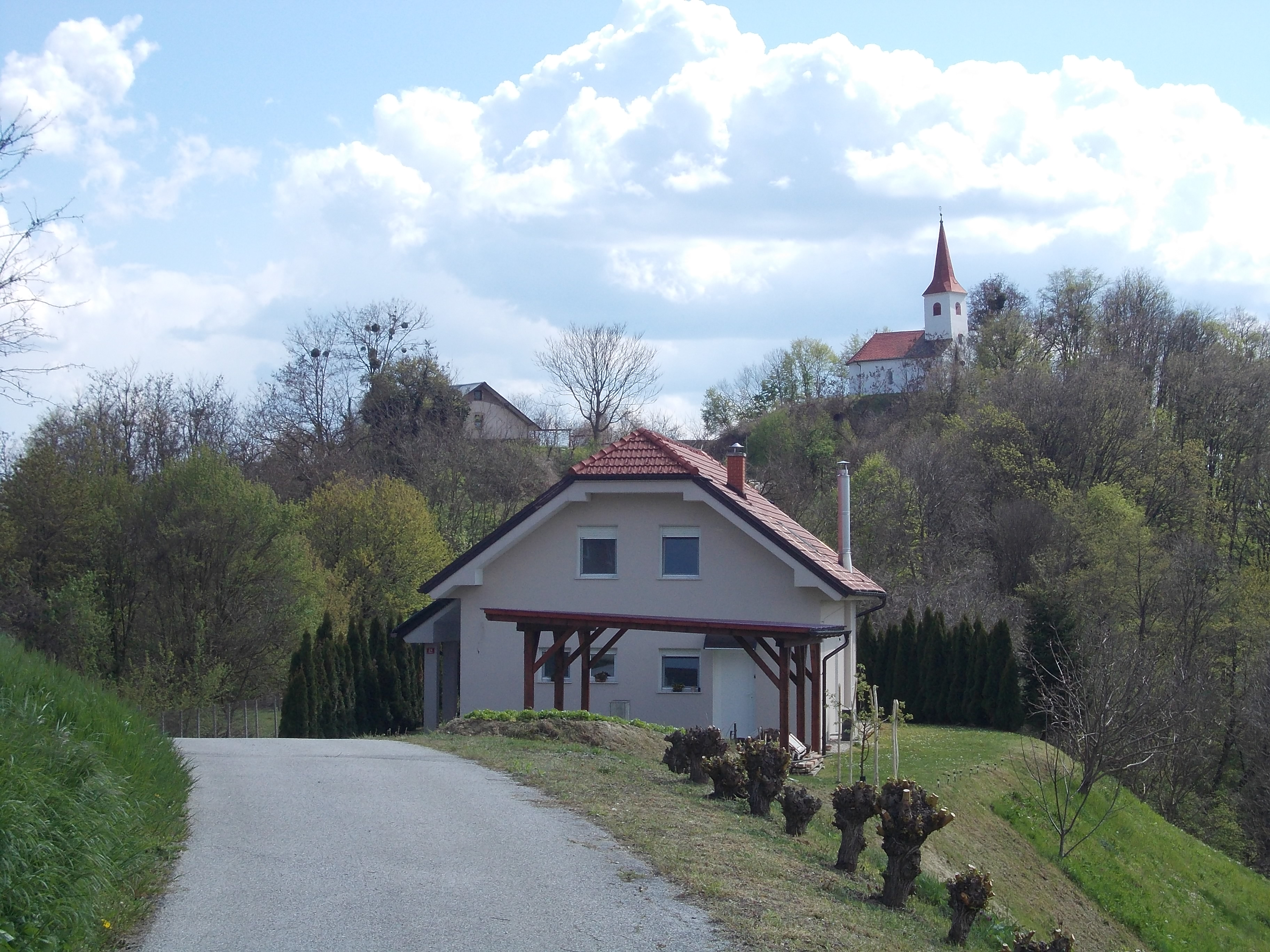

- Location in Slovenia
- Coordinates: 45°58′23.42″N 15°41′15.17″E
- Country: Slovenia
- Traditional region: Styria
- Statistical region: Lower Sava
- Municipality: Brežice

Area
  - Total: 2.01 km^{2} (0.78 sq mi)
- Elevation: 202.2 m (663 ft)

Population (2020)
  - Total: 63
  - Density: 31/km^{2} (81/sq mi)

Dramlja (pronounced [ˈdɾaːmlja]; in older sources also Dramlje, German: Dramle) is a settlement in the Municipality of Brežice in eastern Slovenia. It lies in the valley of Dramlja Creek, a tributary of the Sotla River, close to the border with Croatia. The area is part of the traditional region of Lower Styria. It is now included with the rest of the municipality in the Lower Sava Statistical Region. The settlement includes the hamlet of Sveti Duh (German: Heiligengeist).

== Name ==
Dramlja was attested in written sources in 1309 and 1322 as Draemel (and as Dremel in 1404). Dramlja Creek appeared in written sources in 1344 as Dremel and Dråmel (and as Dro̊mel in 1441 and pach Traml in the 16th century). The name is of uncertain origin; it may be based on the personal name *Drama (indicating some kind of ownership) or may be of pre-Slavic substratum origin. See also Dramlje.

== Churches ==
There are two churches in the settlement. The church dedicated to Saint Andrew, known locally as Saint Andrew on the Rocks (Slovene: Sveti Andrej na skalah), is built on a hill north of the main part of the settlement in the hamlet of Doli. It was first mentioned in documents dating to 1545. It was rebuilt in the 17th century and expanded in the 19th century, when the belfry was added. The second church stands on a hill amid vineyards further up the valley to the northwest. It is dedicated to the Holy Spirit and is a single-nave church built in the 17th century with 18th- and 19th-century additions. Both belong to the Parish of Bizeljsko.
