= Veščica, Murska Sobota =

Veščica Veščica pri Murski Soboti
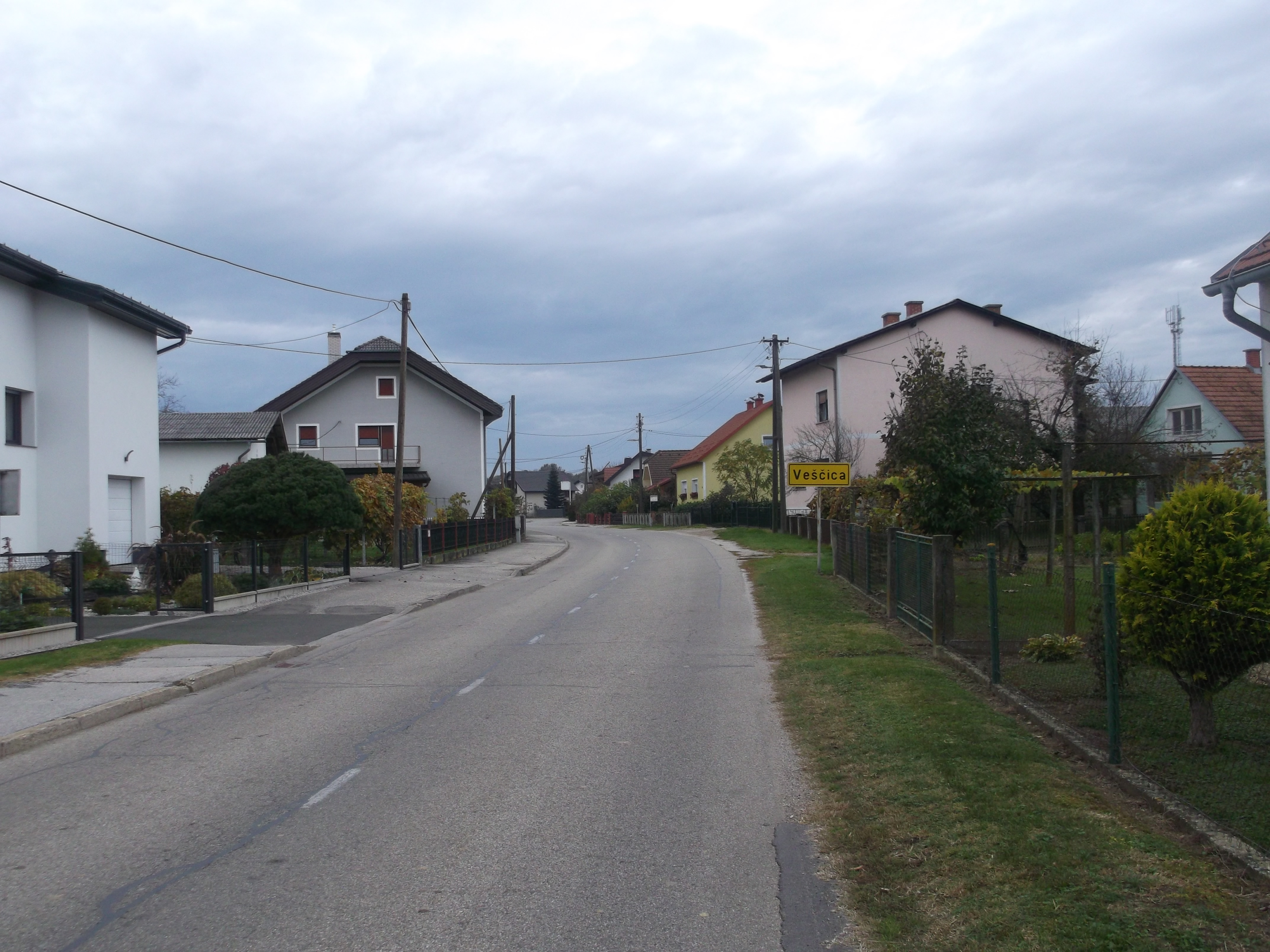

- Location in Slovenia
- Coordinates: 46°40′17″N 16°7′53″E
- Country: Slovenia
- Traditional region: Prekmurje
- Statistical region: Mura
- Municipality: Murska Sobota

Area
  - Total: 3.03 km^{2} (1.17 sq mi)
- Elevation: 192.8 m (633 ft)

Population (2022)
  - Total: 420

Veščica or Veščica pri Murski Soboti (pronounced [ʋɛˈʃtʃiːtsa pɾi ˈmuːɾski ˈsoːbɔti]; Hungarian: Falud) is a village in the Municipality of Murska Sobota in the Prekmurje region of Slovenia.

== Name ==
The name of the settlement was changed from Veščica to Veščica pri Murski Soboti in 1955.
