= Dramlje =

Dramlje Trennenberg Šent Ilj (until 1955)
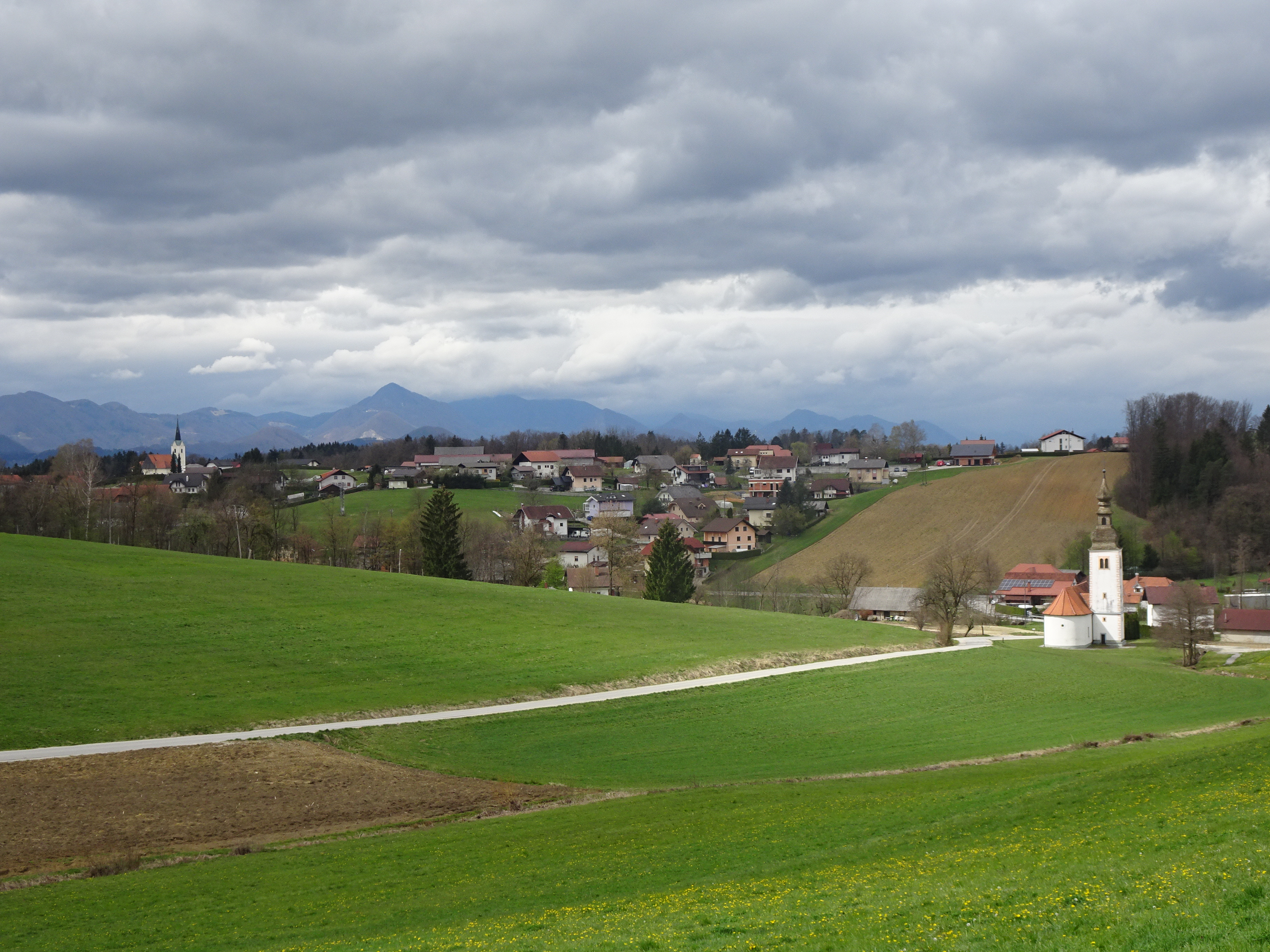
- Dramlje

- Location in Slovenia
- Coordinates: 46°16′38.71″N 15°23′43.35″E
- Country: Slovenia
- Traditional region: Styria
- Statistical region: Savinja
- Municipality: Šentjur
- Elevation: 303 m (994 ft)

Population (2020)
  - Total: 423

Dramlje (pronounced [ˈdɾaːmljɛ]; German: Sankt Egidi) is one of the most populous settlements in the Municipality of Šentjur, in eastern Slovenia. The settlement, and the entire municipality, are included in the Savinja Statistical Region, which is in the Slovenian portion of the historical Duchy of Styria.

== Name ==
The name of the settlement was changed from Šent Ilj (literally, 'Saint Giles') to Dramlje in 1955. The name was changed on the basis of the 1948 Law on Names of Settlements and Designations of Squares, Streets, and Buildings as part of efforts by Slovenia's postwar communist government to remove religious elements from toponyms. Before the name Dramlje (German: Trennenberg) was applied to the settlement, it was a regional name referring to a broad region north of Šentjur, stretching from Vojnik to Ponikva. This regional name was attested in 1043 as Teramperch (and as Dremel in 1354, Dreming in 1377, Dremyng in 1401, and Dråming in 1450). It is of uncertain origin; it may be based on the personal name *Drama (indicating some kind of ownership) or may be of pre-Slavic substratum origin. See also Dramlja.

== Notable people ==
Notable people that were born or lived in Dramlje include:

- Ivan Kolarič (1869–1894), poet
- Matija Vodušek (1802–1872), writer
- Fran Župnek (1860–1928), railway and waterworks developer
