= Vrh pri Boštanju =

- Location in Slovenia
- Coordinates: 46°0′19.65″N 15°15′32.44″E
- Country: Slovenia
- Traditional region: Lower Carniola
- Statistical region: Lower Sava
- Municipality: Sevnica

Area
  - Total: 5.37 km^{2} (2.07 sq mi)
- Elevation: 394.5 m (1,294 ft)

Population (2002)
  - Total: 182

Vrh pri Boštanju (pronounced [ˈʋəɾx pɾi bɔˈʃtaːnju]; German: Werch) is a settlement in the hills southwest of Boštanj in the Municipality of Sevnica in east-central Slovenia. The area is part of the historical region of Lower Carniola. The municipality is now included in the Lower Sava Statistical Region. The settlement includes the hamlets of Dule, Pleček, Gabrnik, Ravne, Topolovec, Grič, Hrib, Dobje, Reviše, Volčje Jame (German: Wolfsgraben), Drče, Okič, Sleme, Drenovec, Straški Hrib, and Lipoglav.

== Name ==
The name of the settlement was changed from Vrh to Vrh pri Boštanju in 1953. In the past the German name was Werch.

== Mass grave ==
Vrh pri Boštanju is the site of a mass grave from the period immediately after the Second World War. The Grahovica Mass Grave (Slovene: Grobišče ob Grahovici) is located on a slope west of the Medved farm below a path into the woods, about 50 meters (160 ft) from the house and 50 meters (160 ft) from the road. It contains the remains of a group of Croatian prisoners of war that tried to pass photos to local residents before being taken away and murdered in May 1945.

== Churches ==
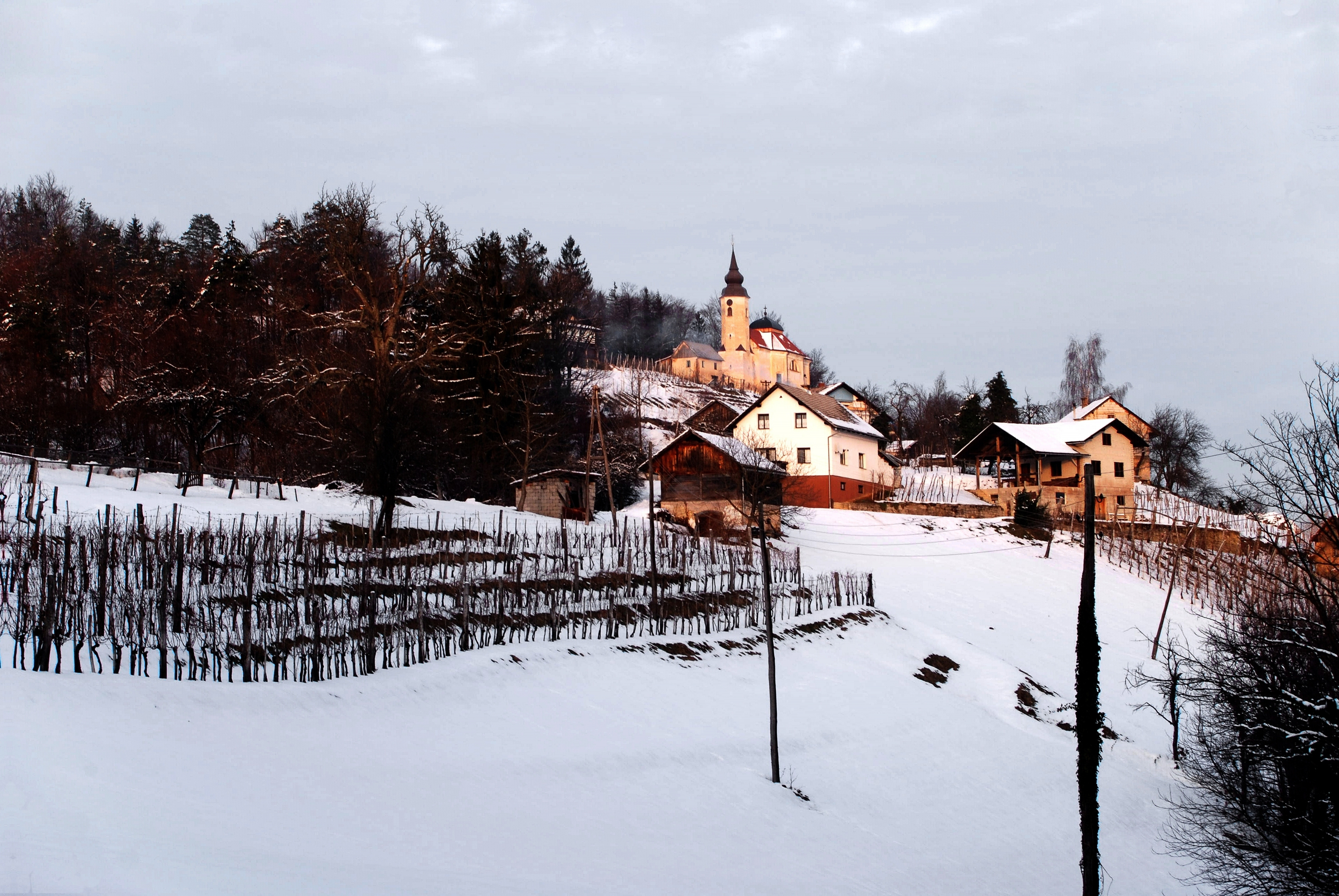
Topolovec Hill with Assumption of the Virgin Mary Church

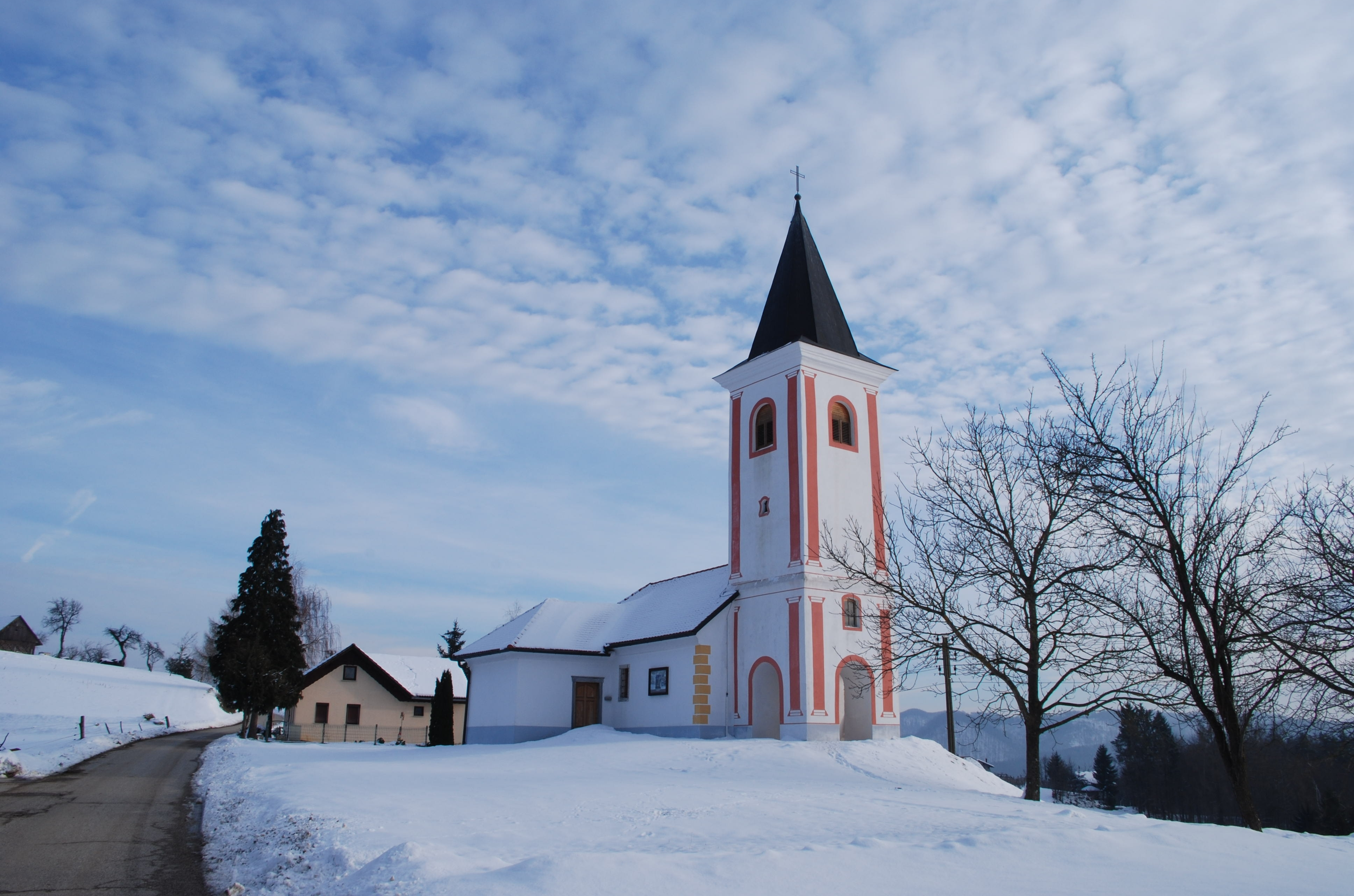
St. Anne's Church in the hamlet of Okič

There are two churches in the settlement. Both belongs to the Parish of Boštanj. The pilgrimage church dedicated to the Assumption of Mary is built on top of Topolovec Hill south of Grahovica Creek. It was built in 1734. A second church in the western part of the settlement (the hamlet of Okič) is dedicated to Saint Anne and dates to the 17th century.
