= Sela pri Ratežu =

- Location in Slovenia
- Coordinates: 45°49′21.67″N 15°13′40.02″E
- Country: Slovenia
- Traditional region: Lower Carniola
- Statistical region: Southeast Slovenia
- Municipality: Novo Mesto

Area
  - Total: 0.603 km^{2} (0.233 sq mi)
- Elevation: 186.5 m (612 ft)

Population (2026)
  - Total: 68
  - Density: 113/km^{2} (290/sq mi)
- Postal code: 8000

Sela pri Ratežu (pronounced [ˈseːla pɾi ˈɾaːtɛʒu]) is a settlement in the hills east of Novo Mesto in southeastern Slovenia. The area is part of the traditional region of Lower Carniola and is now included in the Southeast Slovenia Statistical Region. In January 2026, the population was 68.
