= Big Brother (Slovenian TV series) season 1 =

Big Brother
- Season 1
- Presented by: Nina Osenar
- No. of days: 84
- No. of housemates: 18
- Winner: Andrej
- Runner-up: Miha

Release
- Original network: Kanal A
- Original release: 17 March – 9 June 2007

Season chronology
- Next → Big Brother 2

Big Brother is a reality show shown on Kanal A in which a number of contestants live in an isolated house trying to avoid being evicted by the public with the aim of winning a large cash prize at the end of the run. It is based on the international Big Brother format produced by Endemol. It first aired on March 17, 2007.

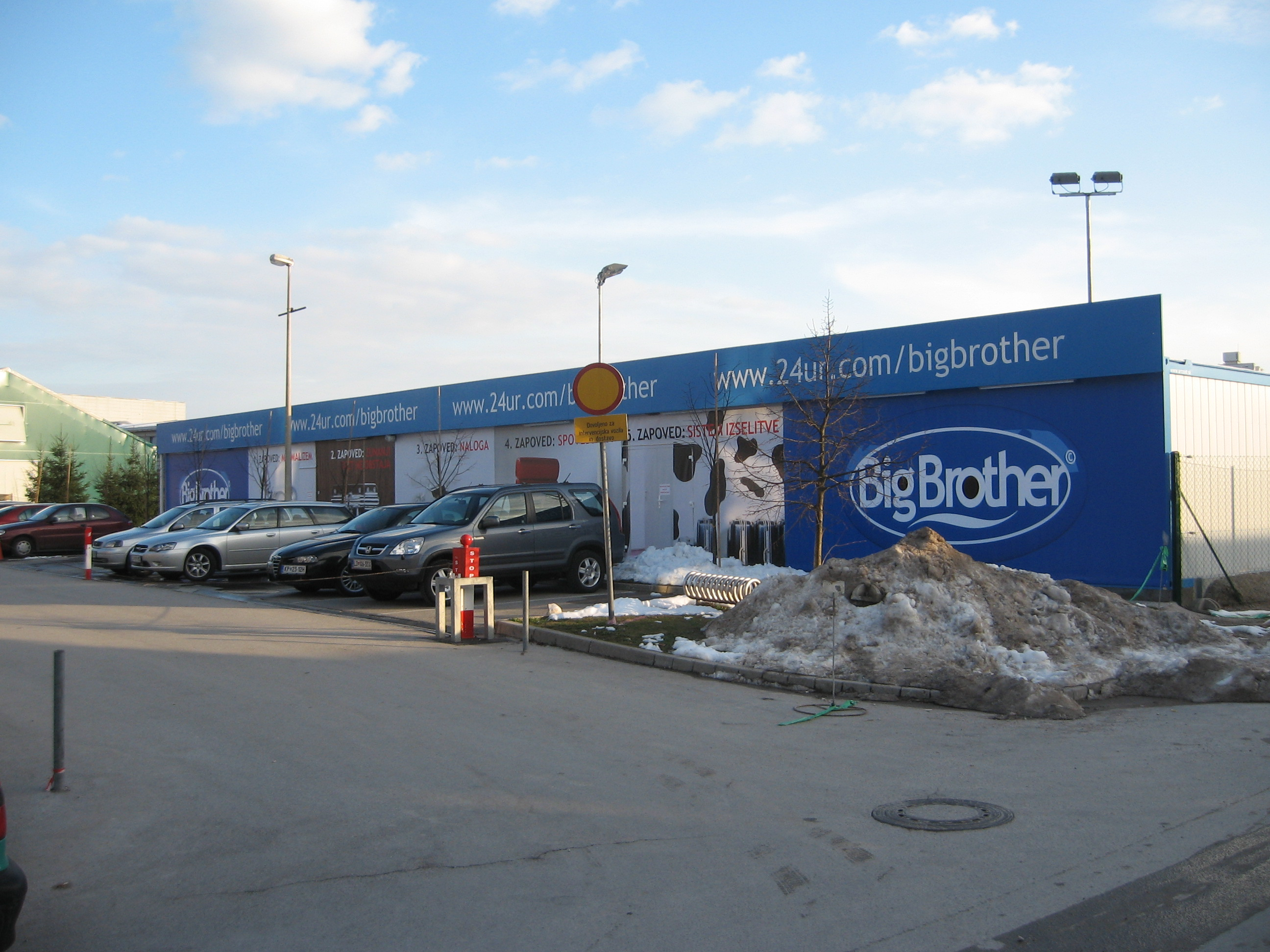
Big Brother's house

The first Slovenian season of Big Brother ran 85 days, started on March 17, 2007, and ended on June 9, 2007. The show was hosted by Nina Osenar. The prize is 75,000 Euro.

== Housemates ==
In the first season, there are 12 original housemates. At later stages, 6 new housemates entered the house. Andrej the Australian and Janez's brother is the winner. Here are all the participants:

Housemates	Age	Entered	Exited	Status
Andrej	27	Day 1	Day 85	Winner
Miha	21	Day 1	Day 85	Runner-Up
Marina	21	Day 49	Day 84	Evicted
Stane	20	Day 1	Day 83	Evicted
Janez	55	Day 49	Day 78	Evicted
Tjaša	19	Day 21	Day 71	Evicted
Alisa	21	Day 49	Day 69	Walked
Tina	22	Day 1	Day 64	Evicted
Alen	26	Day 1	Day 57	Evicted
Jasmina	19	Day 1	Day 50	Evicted
Sonja	26	Day 8	Day 43	Evicted
Pero	24	Day 21	Day 41	Ejected
Suzana	38	Day 1	Day 36	Evicted
Robert	31	Day 1	Day 29	Evicted
Nina	28	Day 1	Day 22	Evicted
Jessy	20	Day 1	Day 15	Evicted
Aleš	27	Day 1	Day 10	Evicted
Veronika	23	Day 1	Day 10	Walked

=== First Batch ===
The following housemates entered on Day 1. In parentheses were their ages as of the time they stayed in the house.

- Andrej (27) - WINNER
- Miha (21)
- Stane (20)
- Tina (22)
- Alen (26)
- Jasmina (19)
- Suzana (38)
- Robert (31)
- Nina (28)
- Jessy (20)
- Aleš (27)
- Veronika (23)

=== Second Batch ===
The following housemates entered on Day 8. In parentheses were their ages as of the time they stayed in the house.

- Sonja (26)

=== Third Batch ===
The following housemates entered on Day 21. In parentheses were their ages as of the time they stayed in the house.

- Tjaša (19)
- Pero (24)

=== Fourth Batch ===
The following housemates entered on Day 49. In parentheses were their ages as of the time they stayed in the house.

- Marina (21)
- Janez (55)
- Alisa (21)

== Big Brother Swap ==
The official website announced on Day 27 (April 12, 2007) that one Philippine housemate would trade places with a housemate from the Slovenian version. Days later, Tina was chosen to swap with Bruce.

Promotion ads for this event likened this to an alien abduction because the Philippine housemates were not aware that Bruce will trade places with Tina, a foreigner, until Tina entered the Philippine House. On the other hand, the Slovenian housemates already knew of the Swap and prepared for this event, which was expected to be a cultural exchange of sorts for both sides. The swap took place starting Day 36 (April 21) and ended on Day 41 (April 26), when the swapped housemates returned to their respective Houses.

Tina Semolic, a 22-year-old former beauty queen, was chosen by the Philippine version's staff because of her personality "would fit well" with the Filipino housemates, as well as being nice and not too aggressive. On the other hand, Bruce was chosen by the Slovenian staff because of his physique and his "very Filipino" characteristics that would stir up competition among the men there.

To let Filipino viewers know about Bruce's situation in the Slovenian House, some footage from the Slovenian version related to Bruce was also shown, aside from the events inside the Philippine House. English conversations recorded on both Houses were subtitled into Filipino, while any Slovenian conversation and comment was dubbed over by Filipino voice actors to let the Filipino viewers understand better.

Below is a list of activities each swapped housemate did in their respective host country's Houses, aside from introductions and trading of basic phrases:

Tina	Taught the housemates the Slovenian polka.; Cooked a Slovenian dessert called a potica.; Learned to properly eat a mango.; Learned from Saicy and Wendy how to sing Pinoy Ako and explain its meaning.; Told by Nel to eat some Filipino street foods, but she refused to eat balut after squirming at the sight of its contents.; Practiced baton twirling together with Beatriz and Saicy.; Acted as Reyna Elena in the House's celebration of the Santacruzan.; Took part in the PBB Fiesta, even finishing the game of palo sebo for her fellow housemates.
Bruce	Cooked adobo for his fellow housemates. The Slovenian housemates thought it was so delicious, even Sonja, the resident vegetarian, ate it, too.; Taught the housemates tinikling. But since the others had a hard time keeping the rhythm in the dance, they later turned one of the two bamboo poles used in the dance into a limbo pole.; Learned the Slovenian version's theme song.; Built a snowman out of artificial snow (together with his fellow housemates). Real snow could not be provided because winter had already passed in Slovenia.; Signed T-shirts for an upcoming auction. Slovenian viewers already knew about his mother's condition and sales from the auction will be used for her benefit.; Participated in a task which required the housemates to disguise themselves as animals using body paint. Bruce played a cow.

While Tina left the Philippines without much incident, Bruce left Slovenia with controversy brewing up behind him. Slovenian housemates Miha and Pero made inappropriate remarks about Bruce — remarks that did not sit well with both Big Brother and the viewers there. Because of that and Pero's "plan" of "stabbing Big Brother," Big Brother removed Pero from the Slovenian House and then added Miha to the list of nominees for eviction, which already included Jasmina and Sonja.

Tina was later evicted on Day 63 of the Slovenian version, about five weeks after the swap.

On Day 125 of the Philippine version, Tina returned to the Pinoy Big Brother house to have a celebratory dinner with the Big 4, Bea, Gee-Ann, Mickey and Wendy. She left the house the same night and participated in the Finale, where she danced various Philippine dances and took part in the awarding ceremony for the Big 4.

== Nomination Table ==
	Week 2	Week 3	Week 4	Week 5	Week 6	Week 7	Week 8	Week 9	Week 10	Week 11	Week 12 Final		Nominations received
Andrej	Alen; Nina	Alen; Nina	Exempt	Pero; Sonja	Jasmina; Sonja	Jasmina; Tina	Stane; Tina	Alisa; Janez	Alisa; Janez	Janez; Marina	Winner (Day 85)		13
Miha	Aleš; Veronika	Alen; Nina	Robert; Sonja	Jasmina; Sonja	Andrej; Jasmina	Alen; Tina	Tina; Tjaša	Alisa; Janez	Alisa; Janez	Janez; Marina	Runner-up (Day 85)		25
Marina	Not in House						Exempt	Stane; Tina	Janez; Stane	Andrej; Stane	Evicted (Day 84)		5
Stane	Aleš; Jessy	Nina; Robert	Exempt	Pero; Sonja	Pero; Sonja	Alen; Jasmina	Alen; Miha	Alisa; Janez	Alisa; Janez	Janez; Marina	Evicted (Day 83)		5
Janez	Not in House						Exempt	Alisa; Tjaša	Marina; Tjaša	Miha; Stane	Evicted (Day 78)		12
Tjaša	Not in House		Exempt	Miha; Sonja	Pero; Sonja	Alen; Miha	Andrej; Miha	Alisa; Miha	Alisa; Janez	Evicted (Day 71)			5
Alisa	Not in House						Exempt	Marina; Tina	Janez; Tjaša	Walked (Day 69)			10
Tina	Aleš; Veronika	Miha; Robert	Exempt	Jasmina; Miha	Pero; Sonja	Andrej; Miha	Andrej; Miha	Alisa; Miha	Evicted (Day 64)				7
Alen	Andrej; Jessy	Andrej; Nina	Exempt	Andrej; Sonja	Andrej; Jasmina	Andrej; Jasmina	Andrej; Miha	Evicted (Day 57)					9
Jasmina	Miha; Suzana	Andrej; Miha	Miha; Sonja	Miha; Suzana	Pero; Sonja	Andrej; Miha	Evicted (Day 50)						11
Sonja	Not in House	Suzana; Tina	Miha; Robert	Miha; Suzana	Jasmina; Miha	Evicted (Day 43)							15
Pero	Not in House		Exempt	Jasmina; Suzana	Jasmina; Tjaša	Ejected (Day 41)							7
Suzana	Robert; Veronika	Miha; Robert	Robert; Sonja	Pero; Sonja	Evicted (Day 36)								6
Robert	Aleš; Jessy	Miha; Nina	Miha; Sonja	Evicted (Day 29)									10
Nina	Alen; Jessy	Alen; Robert	Evicted (Day 22)										7
Jessy	Miha; Robert	Evicted (Day 15)											4
Aleš	Nina; Robert	Walked (Day 10)											4
Veronika	Miha; Suzana	Walked (Day 10)											3
Against public vote	~~Aleš,~~; Jessy, Robert	Miha, Nina, Robert	Miha, Robert, Sonja	Miha, Pero, Sonja, Suzana, Tjaša	Jasmina, Miha, Sonja	Alen, Andrej, Jasmina, Miha	Alen, Andrej, Miha	Alisa, Janez, Miha, Stane, Tina	~~Alisa,~~; Janez, Tjaša	Janez, Marina	Andrej, Janez, Marina, Miha, Stane		
Walked	Veronika, Aleš	none							Alisa	none			
Ejected	none					Pero	none						
Evicted	Jessy; 67% to evict	Nina; 41% to evict	Robert; 62% to evict	Suzana; 50% to evict	Sonja; 53% to evict	Jasmina; 67% to evict	Alen; 53% to evict	Tina; 73% to evict	Tjaša; 72% to evict	Janez; 70% to evict	Stane; Fewest votes (out of 4)	Marina; Fewest votes (out of 3)	
Evicted	Jessy; 67% to evict	Nina; 41% to evict	Robert; 62% to evict	Suzana; 50% to evict	Sonja; 53% to evict	Jasmina; 67% to evict	Alen; 53% to evict	Tina; 73% to evict	Tjaša; 72% to evict	Janez; 70% to evict	Miha; Fewest votes (out of 2)		
Saved	Robert; 33%	Robert; 37% Miha; 22%	Sonja; 28% Miha; 10%	Sonja; 41% Miha; 3% Pero; 3% Tjaša; 3%	Jasmina; 42% Miha; 5%	Miha; 21% Alen; 8% Andrej; 4%	Miha; 39% Andrej; 8%	Alisa; 22% Janez; 2% Miha; 2% Stane; 1%	Janez; 28%	Marina; 30%	Andrej; Most votes to win		
