= Big Brother Slavnih =

- No. of days: 71
- No. of housemates: 14
- Winner: Činč
- Runner-up: Ines

Series chronology
- ← Previous; Big Brother 2 (Slovenia) Next → Big Brother 3 (Slovenia)

Big Brother Slavnih (lit. Big Brother Famous) is the celebrity version of Big Brother in Slovenia. It began on 3 October 2010, two and a half years after the Big Brother 2. Nina Osenar, who was hosted the previous seasons, returned to host the show.

As of October 27, 2010, this season averaged a 43% ratings share making it the highest-rated Slovenian season of Big Brother to air so far.

On Day 27, Big Brother Slovenia took part in a swap with Big Brother Finland 2010, in which Slovenia's Sandra swapped houses with Finland's Niko N. Ultimately, it was early front runner Jože Činč who won the season.

The baseline grand prize was €150,000. Housemates were to complete tasks every week during the show. For every incomplete task, Big Brother reduced the total prize by €15,000. After ten weeks, the total prize stood at €90,000. The lost €60,000 was given to charity.

== Housemates ==
=== Činč ===
Jože Činč (known as Činč) is a T.V. presenter and radio host. Činč entered the house on Day 1.

=== Gena ===
Gena Zeneli is a dancer and choreographer, and Nana's husband. Gena entered the house on Day 1. Gena became the fifth housemate to be evicted from the house on Day 29. In a twist, Gena returned to the house on Day 50 as a full-fledged housemate.

=== Igor ===
Igor Misdaris is a musician. Igor entered the house on Day 1. Igor was put up for eviction by his fellow housemates on Day 2 after many of them noticed that he was having trouble integrating with the rest of the group. Igor became the fifth celebrity to be evicted from the house on Day 43.

=== Ines ===
Ines Juranovič is a Playmate and "Miss Hawaiian Tropic". Ines entered the house on Day 1.

=== Maki ===
Maki is a singer for the group Bacchus. Maki entered the house along with Mišo on Day 25.

=== Mišo ===
Mišo Kontrec is a musician and leader of the Slovenian band, Langa. Mišo entered the house along with Maki on Day 25.

=== Nana ===
Nana Zeneli is a T.V. presenter, and Gena's wife. Nana entered the house on Day 1. Nana became the fourth celebrity to be evicted from the house on Day 36.

=== Nena ===
Nena Muršič is a physical trainer known as "Miss Fitness". Nena entered the house on Day 1. Nena was put up for eviction by her fellow housemates on Day 2, against Igor, after having been deemed "selfish" and "bossy". Nena became the first celebrity to be evicted from the house on Day 8.

=== Pia ===
Ida "Pia" Vesel is an erotic dancer. Pia entered the house on Day 1. Pia became the third celebrity to be evicted from the house on Day 22.

=== Rok ===
Rok Kosmač is a musician and singer. Rok entered the house on Day 1. Rok became the second celebrity to be evicted from the house on Day 15.

=== Sandra ===
Sandra Auer is a 24-year-old T.V. presenter, radio DJ, and actor. Sandra entered the house on Day 1.

=== Teja ===
Teja Stražišar is an 18-year-old model. Teja entered the house on Day 43. Teja voluntarily left the house on Day 48.

=== Urška ===
Urška Čepin entered the house on Day 20. Urška became the seventh celebrity to be evicted from the house on Day 50.

=== Zlatko ===
Zlatan "Zlatko" Čordič is a rapper. Zlatko entered the house on Day 1. Zlatko was ejected from the house on Day 48.

== Nominations table ==
Every week housemates nominate two fellow housemates for eviction. Intruders (those who join once the show is in progress) are exempt from nominations for their first week in the house, and are not allowed to nominate fellow housemates that week. The viewing public decide which nominated housemate is evicted.

	Week 1	Week 2	Week 3	Week 4	Week 5	Week 6	Week 7	Week 8	Week 9	Week 10	
Činč	Pia; Nena	Zlatko; Rok	Zlatko; Pia	Nana; Gena	Igor; Zlatko	Igor; Zlatko	Zlatko; Ines	Sandra; Maki	Ines; Gena	Winner (Day 71)	
Ines	Igor; Nena	Zlatko; Rok	Pia; Igor	Gena; Činč	Igor; Nana	Not eligible	Urška; Činč	Sandra; Maki	Gena; Mišo	Runner-Up (Day 71)	
Mišo	Not in house				Exempt	Ines; Zlatko	Ines; Urška	Ines; Maki	Gena; Ines	Third Place (Day 71)	
Sandra	Nena; Igor	Pia; Zlatko	Pia; Zlatko	Gena; Nana	Urška; Nana	Igor; Zlatko	Urška; Činč	Maki; Činč	Činč; Gena	Fourth Place (Day 71)	
Gena	Nena; Sandra	Rok; Pia	Pia; Igor	Činč; Sandra	Evicted (Day 29)			Sandra; Ines	Ines; Mišo	Re-evicted (Day 64)	
Maki	Not in house				Exempt	Ines; Zlatko	Činč; Urška	Sandra; Činč	Evicted (Day 57)		
Urška	Not in house			Exempt	Zlatko; Nana	Igor; Zlatko	Sandra; Ines	Evicted (Day 50)			
Zlatko	Nana; Gena	Nana; Sandra	Pia; Nana	Gena; Činč	Sandra; Urška	Not eligible	Urška; Činč	Ejected (Day 48)			
Teja	Not in house						Exempt	Walked (Day 48)			
Igor	Nena; Nana	Rok; Ines	Nana; Gena	Gena; Činč	Zlatko; Ines	Not eligible	Evicted (Day 43)				
Nana	Nena; Igor	Rok; Zlatko	Pia; Zlatko	Činč; Sandra	Ines; Sandra	Evicted (Day 36)					
Pia	Igor; Zlatko	Ines; Sandra	Sandra; Ines	Evicted (Day 22)							
Rok	Činč; Nana	Gena; Ines	Evicted (Day 15)								
Nena	Zlatko; Pia	Evicted (Day 8)									
Notes	None				1	2, 3, 4, 5	None				
Nominated	Igor; Nena	Rok; Zlatko	Pia; Zlatko	Činč; Gena	Nana; Urška; Zlatko	Činč; Igor; Maki; Mišo; Zlatko	Činč; Urška	Maki; Sandra	Gena; Ines	All; Housemates	
Evicted	Nena; Fewest votes to save	Rok; Fewest votes to save	Pia; Fewest votes to save	Gena; Fewest votes to save	Nana; Fewest votes to save	Igor; Fewest votes to save	Urška; Fewest votes to save	Maki; Fewest votes to save	Gena; Fewest votes to save	Sandra; Fewest votes to win	Mišo; Fewest votes to win
Evicted	Nena; Fewest votes to save	Rok; Fewest votes to save	Pia; Fewest votes to save	Gena; Fewest votes to save	Nana; Fewest votes to save	Igor; Fewest votes to save	Urška; Fewest votes to save	Maki; Fewest votes to save	Gena; Fewest votes to save	Ines; Fewest votes to win	Činč; Most votes to win

Notes

- ^1In week five, Urška was automatically nominated for eviction by Big Brother for discussing the outside world.
- ^2As they had been the first three housemates to be "fired" in the previous week's task, only Igor, Ines, and Zlatko could be nominated for eviction and could not nominate.
- ^3In week six, Činč was automatically nominated for eviction by Big Brother for rule breaking.
- ^4In week six, Maki was automatically nominated for eviction by Big Brother for discussing the outside world.
- ^5In week six, Mišo was automatically nominated for eviction by Big Brother for discussing nominations.
