= Slovenia in the Eurovision Song Contest 2024 =

- Eurovision Song Contest 2024
- Participating broadcaster: Radiotelevizija Slovenija (RTVSLO)
- Country: Slovenia
- Selection process: Internal selection
- Announcement date: Artist: 12 December 2023; Song: 20 January 2024

Competing entry
- Song: "Veronika"
- Artist: Raiven
- Songwriters: Bojan Cvjetićanin; Danilo Kapel; Klavdija Kopina; Martin Bezjak; Peter Khoo; Sara Briški Cirman

Placement
- Semi-final result: Qualified (9th, 51 points)
- Final result: 23rd, 27 points

Participation chronology

Slovenia was represented at the Eurovision Song Contest 2024 with the song "Veronika", written by Bojan Cvjetićanin, Danilo Kapel, Klavdija Kopina, Martin Bezjak, Peter Khoo, and Sara Briški Cirman, and performed by Cirman herself under her stage name Raiven. The Slovenian participating broadcaster, Radiotelevizija Slovenija (RTVSLO), initially planned to organise a national final in order to select its entry for the contest, but ultimately opted for an internal selection.

Slovenia was drawn to compete in the first semi-final of the Eurovision Song Contest which took place on 7 May 2024 and was later selected to perform in position 9. At the end of the show, "Veronika" was announced among the top 10 entries of the first semi-final and hence qualified to compete in the final, marking a second consecutive qualification to the final for the country. It was later revealed that Slovenia placed ninth out of the fifteen participating countries in the semi-final with 51 points. In the final, Slovenia performed in position 22 and placed twenty-third out of the 25 performing countries, scoring a total of 27 points.

== Background ==
Prior to the 2024 contest, Radiotelevizija Slovenija (RTVSLO) had participated in the Eurovision Song Contest representing Slovenia twenty-eight times since its first entry in 1993. Its highest placing in the contest, to this point, had been seventh place, achieved on two occasions: in 1995 with the song "Prisluhni mi" performed by Darja Švajger and in 2001 with the song "Energy" performed by Nuša Derenda. Its only other top ten result was achieved in 1997 when "Zbudi se" performed by Tanja Ribič placed tenth. Since the introduction of semi-finals to the format of the contest in 2004, it had thus far managed to qualify to the final on seven occasions, the latest being in 2023, when "Carpe Diem" performed by Joker Out ultimately placed twenty-first in the final.

As part of its duties as participating broadcaster, RTVSLO organises the selection of its entry in the Eurovision Song Contest and broadcasts the event in the country. The broadcaster had usually selected its entry through a national final entitled Evrovizijska Melodija (EMA), which had been produced with variable formats, with the exceptions of 2013, 2021, and 2023, when the entry was internally selected. On 14 September 2023, RTVSLO confirmed its intention to participate in the 2024 contest; plans regarding the selection were announced on 17 October 2023, with the development of a new national final format, Misija Malmö ("Mission Malmö"), though this was later scrapped in favour of an internal selection.

== Before Eurovision ==
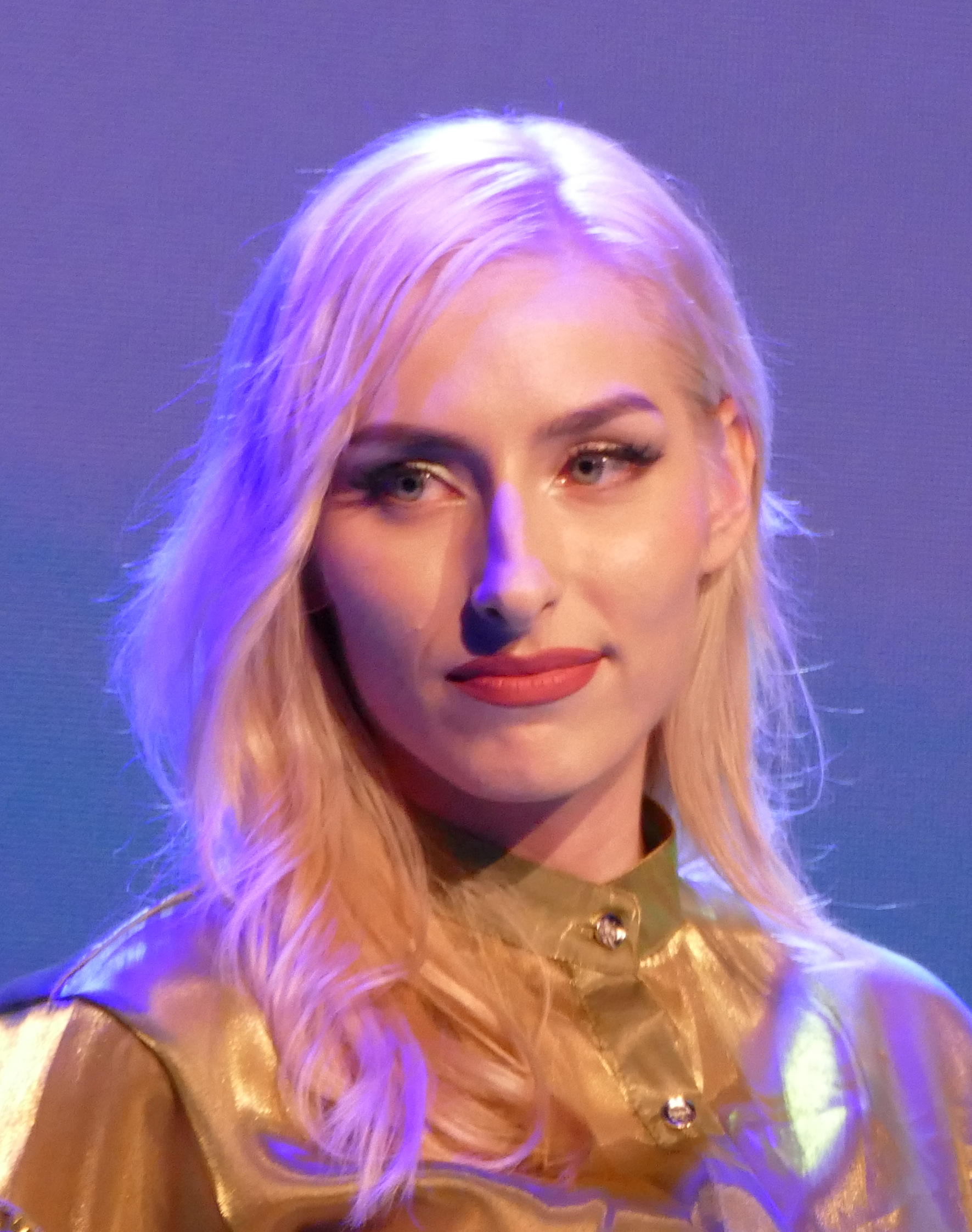
Raiven was internally selected by Radiotelevizija Slovenija to represent Slovenia in Malmö.

=== Internal selection ===
RTVSLO internally selected its entry for the Eurovision Song Contest 2024, marking the fourth time the broadcaster has internally selected its entry for the contest. RTVSLO originally planned to organise a new national final format, Misija Malmö, in order to select its entry for the 2024 contest. It would have consisted of one final, to be broadcast in January 2024. A submission period for interested artists and composers was open between 17 October and 15 November 2023; in order to qualify to compete, the main performer of an entry was required to hold temporary or permanent residence in Slovenia. RTVSLO also directly invited artists and composers from the national music scene. A Slovenian expert committee and an international one were due to select four finalists. By the end of the submission period, around 100 entries had been received.

On 5 December 2023, it was announced that the two panels had directly selected the Slovenian representative for the Eurovision Song Contest, later specifying that the Slovenian panel had narrowed down the entries to five, among which the international panel made the ultimate decision. On 12 December 2023, during a special press conference held at the Ljubljana Slovene National Theatre Opera and Ballet, Raiven was announced as the selected artist; she had previously participated in the 2016, 2017 and 2019 Slovenian national selections. Raiven had submitted two songs to RTVSLO for the contest, "Ofelija" and "Veronika", the latter of which was selected to represent Slovenia in Malmö. "Veronika", written in Slovene and inspired by the story of Veronika of Desenice, was written by Raiven alongside Bojan Cvjetićanin (2023 representative of Slovenia as lead singer of Joker Out), Danilo Kapel, Klavdija Kopina, Martin Bezjak and Peter Khoo. The song was unveiled during a special televised show on 20 January 2024. The show, branded as Misija Malmö, was hosted by Tilen Artač on TV SLO 1 and featured guest performances by Gregor Ravnik and Gregor Strasbergar. RTVSLO also broadcast two introductory programmes for the show on 6 and 13 January 2024, celebrating Joker Out's success in the previous year's Eurovision. During the presentation of the song, the accompanying music video was also released.

=== Irregularity allegations ===
By early January 2024, the Commission for the Prevention of Corruption of the Republic of Slovenia (KPK) received reports that RTVSLO had committed irregularities while conducting its selection for the contest. Although the broadcaster stated that no irregularities had yet been found, the ongoing investigation led Vanja Vardjan, RTVSLO's head of entertainment who was responsible for the process, to resign on 24 January. Vardjan was later replaced by Mario Galunič. While recognising that the selection "was conducted in a non-transparent manner", by early July 2024 the KPK closed the investigation for lack of sufficient evidence confirming the allegations.

=== Promotion and preparation ===
In order to promote "Veronika" as the Slovenian entry for the 2024 contest, Raiven embarked on a promotional tour across Europe and Slovenia. On 24 January 2024, Raiven appeared on Slovenian radio station Hitradio Center, where she discussed the making of the song and plans for the final performance. On 17 February 2024, Raiven released a short documentary, retelling the production of the five songs on her EP Sirene Pt. 1, including "Veronika". On 23 February 2024, she performed "Ofelija" and an acoustic version of "Veronika" alongside Bowrain during the second semi-final of the Croatian national final in Zagreb. The singer also performed at a number of pre-party events, namely: the PrePartyES event in Madrid on 30 March 2024 (where she was joined by dancer Mateja Železnik), the Barcelona Eurovision Party on 6 April 2024, the London Eurovision Party on 7 April 2024, the Eurovision in Concert event in Amsterdam on 13 April 2024, and the Nordic Eurovision Party in Stockholm on 14 April 2024. On 16 April 2024, the singer held a press conference in Ljubljana alongside Ksenija Horvat, Director of TV Slovenija, and Mario Galunič, TV SLO entertainment editor, where she presented the official music video for "Ofelija". The video was also premiered on the official YouTube channel for the Eurovision Song Contest. On 21 April 2024, Raiven performed at the Cankar Centre in Ljubljana, where she performed "Veronika" alongside four other tracks in celebration of ten years in the music industry. On 29 April 2024, she released an acoustic version of "Veronika".

On 23 February 2024, Raiven revealed that she was in the process of recording a new version of "Veronika", which she would perform at the contest in Malmö.

=== Calls for exclusion of Israel ===
The inclusion of Israel in the list of participants of the 2024 contest, despite the humanitarian crisis resulting from Israeli military operations in the Gaza Strip during the Gaza war, sparked controversy in Slovenia as well as several other participating countries, with several groups and politicians in Slovenia calling for the removal of Israel from the contest, including Matjaž Nemec and Irena Joveva. On 7 February 2024, RTVSLO asked the European Broadcasting Union (EBU) to conduct a substantive discussion with its member broadcasters regarding Israel's participation. Director of TV Slovenija Ksenija Horvat cast doubts on whether it was "the time to sing and dance" considering the death toll of the attacks and the famine in Gaza. An official appeal was also signed by several Slovenian non-governmental organisations, musicians and cultural figures, including Astrid Ana Kljun, Boris Cavazza, Bort Ross, Domen Valič, Zala Kralj and Gašper Šantl (who represented Slovenia in the Eurovision Song Contest 2019 in Tel Aviv), Jernej Dirnbek, Ksenija Benedetti, Mia Puhar Rodin, Michael Leopold, N'toko, Saša Vipotnik, Svetlana Makarovič, Tomislav Jovanović, Tomaž Mihelič (who represented Slovenia in the Eurovision Song Contest 2002), and Zlatko. On 1 March 2024, RTVSLO stated it had not received a response from the EBU regarding requests for discussion over Israel's participation.

== At Eurovision ==
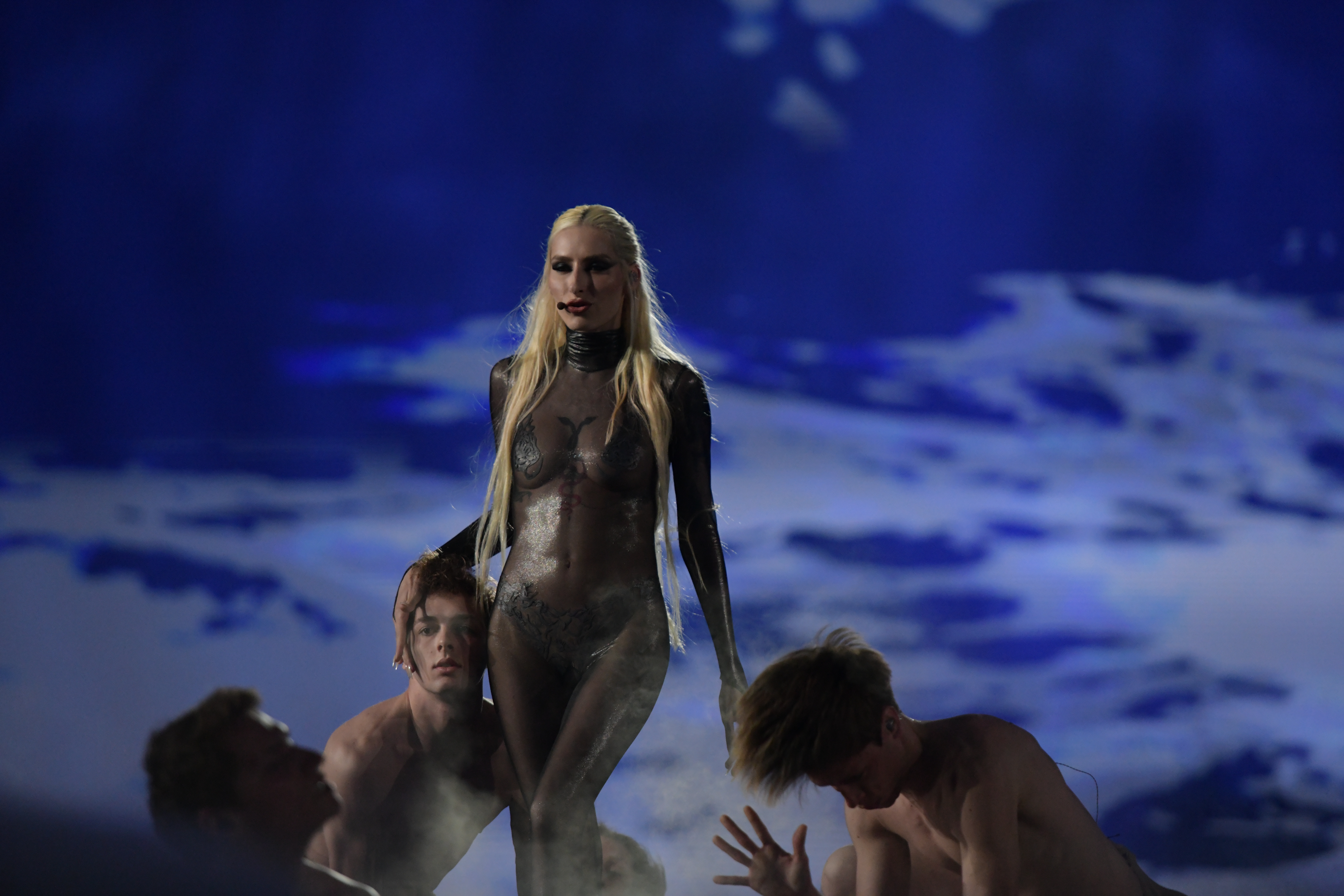
Raiven during a dress rehearsal for the first semi-final on 6 May 2024.

The Eurovision Song Contest 2024 took place at the Malmö Arena in Malmö, Sweden, and consisted of two semi-finals held on the respective dates of 7 and 9 May and the final on 11 May 2024. All nations with the exceptions of the host country and the "Big Five" (France, Germany, Italy, Spain and the United Kingdom) were required to qualify from one of two semi-finals in order to compete in the final; the top ten countries from each semi-final progressed to the final. On 30 January 2024, an allocation draw was held to determine which of the two semi-finals, as well as which half of the show, each country would perform in; the EBU split up the competing countries into different pots based on voting patterns from previous contests, with countries with favourable voting histories put into the same pot. Slovenia was scheduled for the second half of the first semi-final. The shows' producers then decided the running order for the semi-finals; Slovenia was set to perform in position 9.

In Slovenia, RTVSLO broadcast the first semi-final and the final on TV SLO 1 and the second semi-final on TV SLO 2, all with live commentary from Ljubljana by Mojca Mavec, as well as the first semi-final and the final on Radio Val 202 with commentary by Maj Valerij and Igor Bračič. An average of 161,100 viewers were recorded for the first semi-final on TV SLO 1, equating a viewing share of 24%. The second semi-final, broadcast on TV SLO 2, saw a 97,600 viewers (16% share). For the show's live broadcast on TV SLO 1, the final was watched by an average audience of 271,200 viewers, with a share of 47%. The audience peaked at 386,000 viewers for Raiven’s performance of “Veronika”.

On 26 February 2024, RTVSLO confirmed that filming had begun in Celje for the Slovenian postcard, with sights including Celje Castle, Josip Pelikan's glass photography studio, the "City under the City" in the Provincial Museum of Celje, the Celje Technopark and Krekov Square. The postcard featured archival footage from Slovenia's entries to the contest in 2001 and 2019.

=== Performance ===
Raiven took part in technical rehearsals on 28 April and 1 May, followed by dress rehearsals on 6 and 7 May. On 16 April 2024, she revealed that her performance at the contest would be heavily influenced by the music video for "Veronika", and "be based on organicity and movement". Raiven is joined on stage by members of the SNG Opera and Ballet Ljubljana Lukas Bareman, Marin Ino, Filippo Jorio, Matteo Moretto, and Mateja Železnik under the choreographic direction of Lukas Zuschlag. The director for the performance is Nejc Levstik, the lighting is directed by Črt Birsa, the content designer for the LED screens is Žiga Radulj, and the sound image was designed by Martin Bezjak. The costumes, a dark silver bodysuit for Raiven and nude bodysuits for the backing dancers, were designed by Anika Opara's "Aemona" brand. During the performance, LED graphics, pyrotechnics, and low fog and wind effects are used.

=== Semi-final ===
Slovenia performed in position 9, following the entry from Iceland and before the entry from Finland. At the end of the show, the country was announced as a qualifier for the final. It was later revealed that Slovenia placed ninth out of the fifteen participating countries in the first semi-final with 51 points.

=== Final ===
Following the semi-final, Slovenia was drawn to perform in the second half of the final. The country was later chosen by producers to perform in position 22, following the entry from Switzerland and before the entry from Croatia. Raiven once again took part in dress rehearsals on 10 and 11 May before the final, including the jury final where the professional juries cast their final votes before the live show on 11 May. She performed a repeat of her semi-final performance during the final on 11 May. Slovenia placed 23rd in the final, scoring 27 points; 12 points from the public televoting and 15 points from the juries.

=== Voting ===
Below is a breakdown of points awarded by and to Slovenia in the first semi-final and in the final. Voting during the three shows involved each country awarding sets of points from 1-8, 10 and 12: one from their professional jury and the other from televoting in the final vote, while the semi-final vote was based entirely on the vote of the public. The Slovenian jury consisted of Matevž Česen, Maja Keuc, who represented Slovenia in the 2011 contest, Lea Sirk, who represented Slovenia in the 2018 contest, Martin Štibernik, and Filip Vidušin, who represented Slovenia in the 2022 contest as a member of the group LPS. In the first semi-final, Slovenia placed 9th with 51 points, which marked the country's second consecutive qualification to the final. In the final, Slovenia placed 23rd with 27 points. Over the course of the contest, Slovenia awarded its 12 points to Croatia in the first semi-final, and to France (jury) and Croatia (televote) in the final.

RTVSLO appointed Lorella Flego as its spokesperson to announce the Slovenian jury's votes in the final.

==== Points awarded to Slovenia ====
Points awarded to Slovenia (Semi-final 1)
Score	Televote
12 points	
10 points	Croatia; Serbia
8 points	
7 points	Rest of the World
6 points	
5 points	
4 points	Moldova; Poland
3 points	Australia; Finland; Lithuania; Portugal
2 points	Cyprus
1 point	Azerbaijan; Luxembourg

Points awarded to Slovenia (Final)
Score	Televote	Jury
12 points		
10 points	Croatia	Croatia
8 points		
7 points		
6 points		
5 points		
4 points		
3 points		Azerbaijan
2 points	Serbia	Albania
1 point		

==== Points awarded by Slovenia ====
Points awarded by Slovenia (Semi-final 1)
Score	Televote
12 points	Croatia
10 points	Serbia
8 points	Ukraine
7 points	Cyprus
6 points	Lithuania
5 points	Luxembourg
4 points	Ireland
3 points	Finland
2 points	Portugal
1 point	Poland

Points awarded by Slovenia (Final)
Score	Televote	Jury
12 points	Croatia	France
10 points	Israel	Switzerland
8 points	Ukraine	Portugal
7 points	France	Armenia
6 points	Cyprus	Croatia
5 points	Serbia	Luxembourg
4 points	Switzerland	Serbia
3 points	Italy	Italy
2 points	Ireland	Greece
1 point	Sweden	Ireland

==== Detailed voting results ====
Each participating broadcaster assembles a five-member jury panel consisting of music industry professionals who are citizens of the country they represent. Each jury, and individual jury member, is required to meet a strict set of criteria regarding professional background, as well as diversity in gender and age. No member of a national jury was permitted to be related in any way to any of the competing acts in such a way that they cannot vote impartially and independently. The individual rankings of each jury member as well as the nation's televoting results were released shortly after the grand final.

The following members comprised the Slovenian jury:

- Matevž Česen – dancer, choreographer, dance coach
- Maja Keuc – singer-songwriter, represented Slovenia in the 2011 contest
- Lea Sirk – singer-songwriter, represented Slovenia in the 2018 contest
- Martin Štibernik (Mistermarsh) – composer, singer, producer
- Filip Vidušin – singer, producer, represented Slovenia in the 2022 contest as member of LPS

Detailed voting results from Slovenia (Semi-final 1)
R/O	Country	Televote	
R/O	Country	Rank	Points
01	Cyprus	4	7
02	Serbia	2	10
03	Lithuania	5	6
04	Ireland	7	4
05	Ukraine	3	8
06	Poland	10	1
07	Croatia	1	12
08	Iceland	11	
09	Slovenia		
10	Finland	8	3
11	Moldova	14	
12	Azerbaijan	13	
13	Australia	12	
14	Portugal	9	2
15	Luxembourg	6	5

Detailed voting results from Slovenia (Final)
R/O	Country	Jury							Televote	
R/O	Country	Juror A	Juror B	Juror C	Juror D	Juror E	Rank	Points	Rank	Points
01	Sweden	12	8	12	11	11	12		10	1
02	Ukraine	16	11	15	21	16	15		3	8
03	Germany	14	18	20	14	15	17		20	
04	Luxembourg	5	4	9	9	7	6	5	18	
~~05~~	~~Netherlands~~ ‡ (Note: The Netherlands was disqualified prior to the final.)	~~13~~	~~16~~	~~8~~	~~6~~	~~6~~	~~11~~		N/A	
06	Israel	18	12	18	18	17	18		2	10
07	Lithuania	15	20	7	23	22	14		11	
08	Spain	24	25	25	24	25	25		13	
09	Estonia	20	22	14	17	19	19		17	
10	Ireland	9	9	11	15	4	10	1	9	2
11	Latvia	17	19	19	16	23	21		21	
12	Greece	6	15	13	5	5	9	2	16	
13	United Kingdom	25	21	17	25	24	24		22	
14	Norway	23	23	16	22	20	22		19	
15	Italy	7	7	6	8	8	8	3	8	3
16	Serbia	8	6	4	7	9	7	4	6	5
17	Finland	19	24	23	13	18	20		15	
18	Portugal	1	1	5	1	10	3	8	24	
19	Armenia	4	13	10	4	3	4	7	14	
20	Cyprus	11	14	21	10	13	13		5	6
21	Switzerland	3	3	2	3	2	2	10	7	4
22	Slovenia									
23	Croatia	10	5	1	12	12	5	6	1	12
24	Georgia	21	10	22	19	14	16		23	
25	France	2	2	3	2	1	1	12	4	7
26	Austria	22	17	24	20	21	23		12	
