= Carpe diem =

Latin phrase meaning "seize the day"

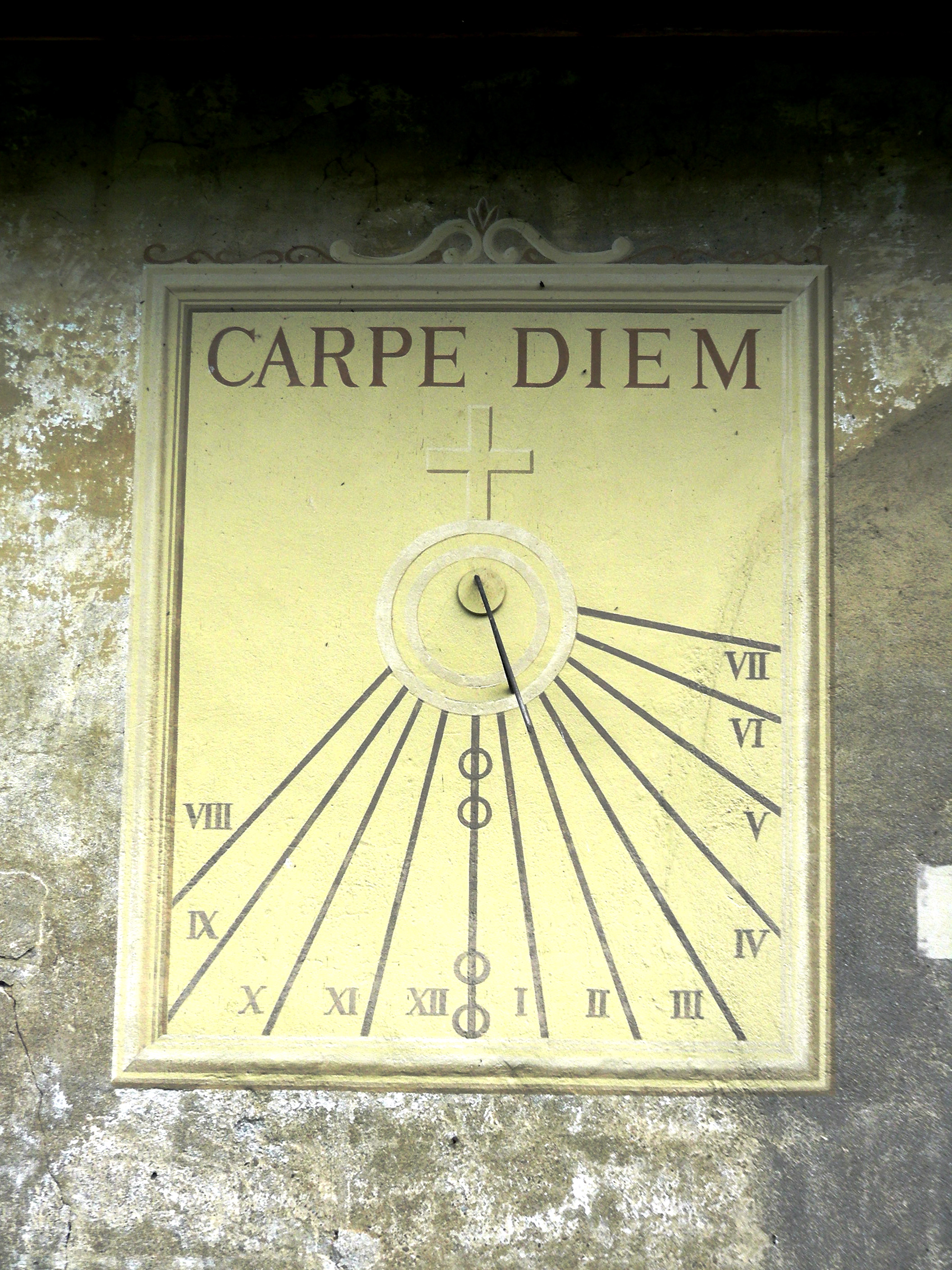
A sundial inscribed carpe diem

Carpe diem (/ˌkɑːr.peɪˈdi.əm/) is a Latin aphorism, usually translated 'seize the day', taken from book 1 of the Roman poet Horace's work Odes (23 BC).

== Translation ==
Carpe is the second-person singular present active imperative of carpō "pick or pluck" used by Horace to mean "enjoy, seize, use, make use of". Diem is the accusative of dies "day". A more literal translation of carpe diem would thus be "pluck the day [as it is ripe]"—that is, enjoy the moment. It has been argued by various authors that this interpretation is closer to Horace's original meaning. Latin scholar and retired Saint Joseph's University professor, Maria S. Marsilio points out that carpe diem is a horticultural metaphor that, particularly seen in the context of the poem, is more accurately translated as "plucking the day", evoking the plucking and gathering of ripening fruits or flowers, enjoying a moment that is rooted in the sensory experience of nature.

== History ==
=== Sources ===
Text from Odes 1.11:

Tu ne quaesieris, scire nefas, quem mihi, quem tibi
finem di dederint, Leuconoe, nec Babylonios
temptaris numeros. ut melius, quidquid erit, pati.
seu pluris hiemes seu tribuit Iuppiter ultimam,
quae nunc oppositis debilitat pumicibus mare
Tyrrhenum. Sapias, vina liques et spatio brevi
spem longam reseces. dum loquimur, fugerit invida
aetas: carpe diem, quam minimum credula postero.

Translation:

Ask not ('tis forbidden knowledge), what our destined term of years,
Mine and yours; nor scan the tables of your Babylonish seers.
Better far to bear the future, my Leuconoe, like the past,
Whether Jove has many winters yet to give, or this our last;
This, that makes the Tyrrhene billows spend their strength against the shore.
Strain your wine and prove your wisdom; life is short; should hope be more?
In the moment of our talking, envious time has ebb'd away.
Seize the present; trust tomorrow e'en as little as you may.

=== In ancient literature ===
Perhaps the first written expression of the concept is the advice given by Siduri to Gilgamesh in Mesopotamian mythology, telling him to forgo his mourning and embrace life, although some scholars see it as simply urging Gilgamesh to abandon his mourning, "reversing the liminal rituals of mourning and returning to the normal and normative behaviors of Mesopotamian society."

== Meaning ==
In Horace, the phrase is part of the longer carpe diem, quam minimum credula postero, which is often translated as "Seize the day, put very little trust in tomorrow (the future)". The ode says that the future is unforeseen and that one should not leave to chance future happenings, but rather one should do all one can today to make one's own future better. This phrase is usually understood against Horace's Epicurean background.

=== Related expressions ===
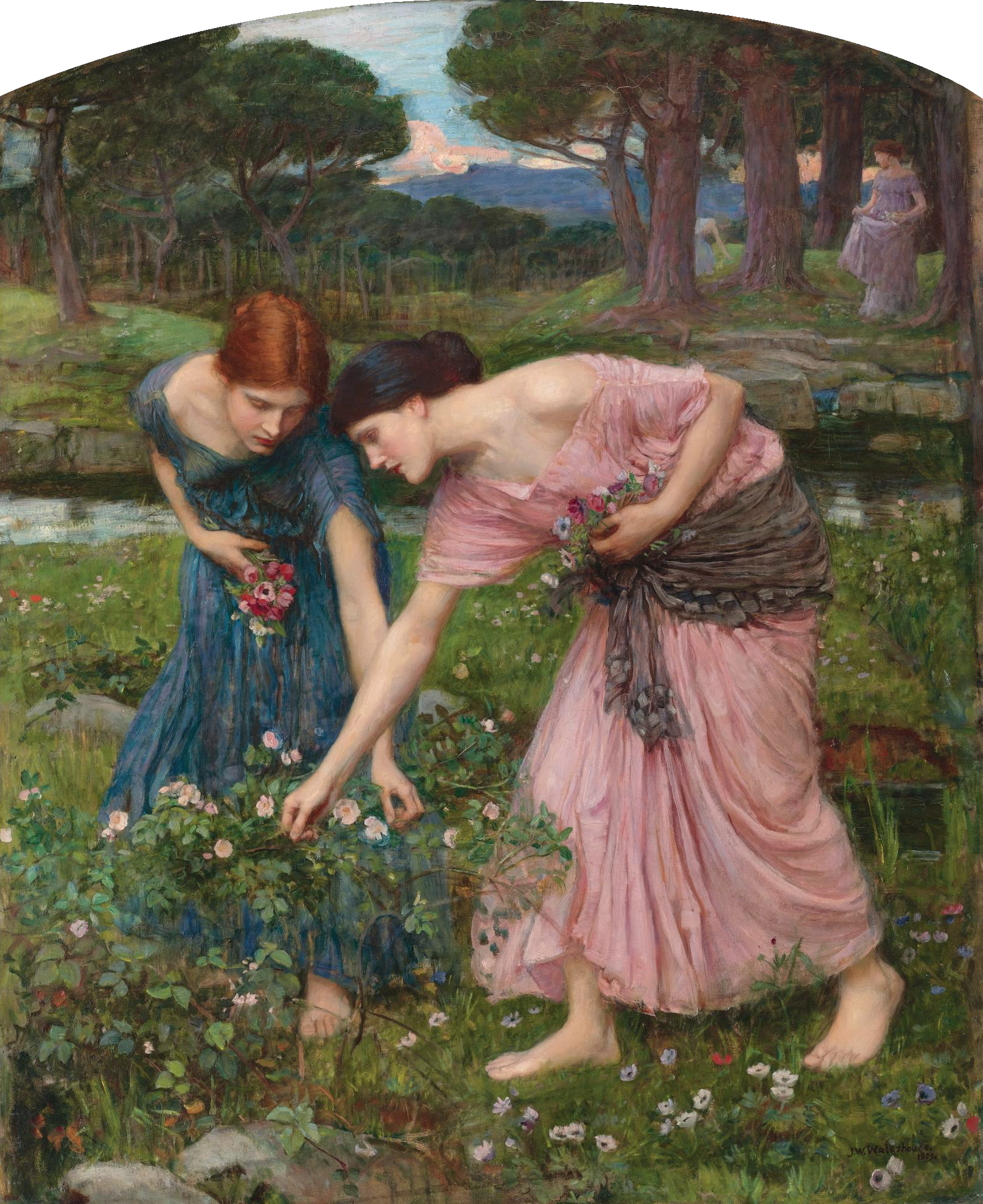
Gather Ye Rosebuds While Ye May, by John William Waterhouse

Collige, virgo, rosas ("gather, girl, the roses") appears at the end of the poem "De rosis nascentibus" ("Of growing roses", also called Idyllium de rosis) attributed to Ausonius or Virgil. It encourages youth to enjoy life before it is too late; compare "Gather ye rosebuds while ye may" from Robert Herrick's 1648 poem "To the Virgins, to Make Much of Time".

"De Brevitate Vitae" ("On the Shortness of Life"), often referred to as "Gaudeamus igitur", (Let us rejoice) is a popular academic commercium song, on taking joy in student life, with the knowledge that one will someday die. It is medieval Latin, dating to 1287.

Related but distinct is the expression memento mori (remember that you are mortal) which carries some of the same connotation as carpe diem. For Horace, mindfulness of our own mortality is key in making us realize the importance of the moment. "Remember that you are mortal, so seize the day." Over time, the phrase memento mori also came to be associated with penitence, as suggested in many vanitas paintings. Today, many people will take the two phrases as representing almost opposite approaches, with carpe diem urging us to savour life and memento mori urging us to resist its allure. This is not the original sense of the memento mori phrase as used by Horace.

== Contemporary mentions ==
In modern English, the expression "YOLO", meaning "you only live once", expresses a similar sentiment.

In the 1989 American film Dead Poets Society, English teacher John Keating, played by Robin Williams, famously says: "Carpe diem. Seize the day, boys. Make your lives extraordinary." Later, this line was voted as the 95th greatest movie quote by the American Film Institute. (The line in this context is grammatically incorrect: when addressed to "boys" in the plural, the phrase ought to be "carpite diem".) Coincidentally, the same sentiment is a major feature of — and provides the title for — Williams's earlier film Seize the Day. Williams later parodied the line in his 1993 film Mrs. Doubtfire, when, posing as the title character while dining in a restaurant, he fishes his false teeth out of a glass of water, saying, "carpe dentum; seize the teeth".

In the Season 2 finale of Phineas and Ferb titled "Rollercoaster: The Musical!", the episode closes with a song titled "Carpe Diem".

In the 2012 album ¡Uno! by Green Day, the third track is titled "Carpe Diem".

In the 2017 Korean drama series Chicago Typewriter, the club Carpe Diem is owned by Shin Yool and is the scene of revolutionary activities of the Joseon Youth Liberation Alliance spearheaded by Seo Hwi-young.

Social philosopher Roman Krznaric suggested in his book Carpe Diem Regained (2017) that carpe diem is the answer to consumer cultures schedules, timed workdays, and planning out our actions over the course of weeks and the weekends, instead of "just do it", with thought experiments for seizing the day rather than placing into calendars.

The song "Carpe Diem" by Joker Out was used to represent Slovenia in the Eurovision Song Contest 2023.

In the game Guilty Gear Strive, the character Unika has a music theme called "CARPE DIEM," composed by Daisuke Ishiwatari and sung by Naoki Hashimoto.

== See also ==
- When life gives you lemons, make lemonade

== Sources ==
- Rohland, R.A. (2022). Carpe Diem. Cambridge Classical Studies. Cambridge University Press. ISBN 978-1-316-51082-7.
