= Veronika (song) =

2024 song by Raiven

Single by Raiven

from the EP Sirene, Pt. 1
- Released: 20 January 2024
- Genre: Alternative pop
- Length: 2:46
- Label: Virgin Music
- Songwriters: Bojan Cvjetićanin; Danilo Kapel; Klavdija Kopina; Martin Bezjak; Peter Khoo; Sara Briški Cirman
- Producers: Danilo Kapel; Martin Bezjak; Peter Khoo; Sara Briški Cirman

Raiven singles chronology
"Ikona" (2023)	"Veronika" (2024)	"Mama" (2024)

Music video
- "Veronika" on YouTube

Eurovision Song Contest 2024 entry
- Country: Slovenia
- Artist: Raiven
- Language: Slovene
- Composers: Bojan Cvjetićanin; Danilo Kapel; Klavdija Kopina; Martin Bezjak; Peter Khoo; Sara Briški Cirman
- Lyricists: Bojan Cvjetićanin; Klavdija Kopina; Sara Briški Cirman

Finals performance
- Semi-final result: 9th
- Semi-final points: 51
- Final result: 23rd
- Final points: 27

Entry chronology
- ◄ "Carpe Diem" (2023)
- "How Much Time Do We Have Left?" (2025) ►

Official performance video
- "Veronika" (First Semi-Final) on YouTube "Veronika" (Grand Final) on YouTube

"Veronika" (Slovene pronunciation: [ʋɛˈɾòːnika]) is a song by Slovenian singer-songwriter Raiven. Inspired by the story of Veronika of Desenice, it was composed by Raiven along with five others, with lyrics also coming from Raiven. The song was self-released on 20 January 2024 through Virgin Music Group, and represented Slovenia in the Eurovision Song Contest 2024, where it placed 23rd with 27 points.

== Background and composition ==
"Veronika" is composed by Bojan Cvjetićanin, Danilo Kapel, Klavdija Kopina, Martin Bezjek, Peter Khoo, and Raiven, with lyrics for the song written by Cvjetićanin, Kopina, and Raiven. Cvjetićanin is a current member and lead singer of Slovenian rock band Joker Out, who represented Slovenia in the Eurovision Song Contest 2023. According to Raiven, the song is inspired by Veronika of Desenice, a Countess of Celje who was tried for witchcraft. She was reportedly murdered under the orders of her father-in-law, because of her lower status and his opposition of her marriage to his son.

In an analysis by Wiwibloggs writer Ruxandra Tudor, the song is described as "a dark alternative pop song", with Veronika described as "a woman of power, a magical figure". She later went on to say that, "the song possesses a mystical allure, and its potency grows as the composition unfolds, showcasing Raiven’s formidable vocal abilities. Raiven [later declares] 'I am, you are, Veronika,' conveying that the power of her character, Veronika, can be found within each of us." Raiven has also described the song as a "child of mine", wishing to put an emphasis on visual art for the song.

The song was originally meant to be written for Raiven's second EP, Sirene, and not meant for the Eurovision Song Contest. According to Raiven, the song took six months to create, and that she focused on the "dramatic quality [of the song]... I wanted her story to not only be expressed but also resonate with the year 2024." Raiven was officially announced as Slovenia's Eurovision representative for 2024 during a press conference held at the Ljubljana Slovene National Theatre Opera and Ballet on 12 December 2023. The song and its accompanying music video premiered on 20 January 2024, during a special television programme titled Misija Malmö.

== Music video and promotion ==
An accompanying music video was released on the same day the music video was released. It was filmed at the Črni Kal quarry and in Radovljica, and was directed by Lukas Zuschlag and Tjaša Barbo and choreographed by Zuschlag. In an interview given out by Radiotelevizija Slovenija, Raiven stated that she wanted to incorporate "the four elements – earth, fire, water and air". Raiven, who has a phobia of deep water, stated that production for the music video was "time-consuming and very stressful". The music video features Raiven in a body of water, with Raiven "calling out" Veronika surrounded by an entourage of four men.

Raiven performed the song at Dora 2024, the preselection for Croatia's Eurovision entry. To further promote the song, Raiven performed the song at various Eurovision pre-parties. Raiven appeared at the Barcelona Eurovision Party on 6 April 2024, the Eurovision in Concert pre-party on 8 April, and the Nordic Eurovision Party on 14 April.

== Critical reception ==
"Veronika" has drawn mixed reception. In a Wiwibloggs review containing several reviews from several critics, the song was rated 6.5 out of 10 points, earning 20th out of the 37 songs competing in the Eurovision Song Contest 2024 on the site's annual ranking. Another review conducted by ESC Bubble that contained reviews from a combination of readers and juries rated the song sixth out of the 15 songs "Veronika" was competing against in its the Eurovision semi-final. Vulture's Jon O'Brien ranked the song 31st overall, declaring that Raiven had "thrown everything but the kitchen sink into this attempt: operatic wails, galloping drums, and the kind of click-clacking noises that suggest 2018 winner Netta accidentally wandered into the studio." Erin Adam of The Scotsman rated the song four out of 10 points, deeming the song to be "a little repetitive". In contrast, ESC Beat's Doron Lahav ranked the song as his overall winner, stating the song provided "a very whole package, with mysterious production and rich arranagment [sic]".

== Eurovision Song Contest ==
=== Internal selection ===
Slovenia's broadcaster Radiotelevizija Slovenija (RTVSLO) officially announced their participation in the Eurovision Song Contest 2024 on 14 September 2023. Initially, the broadcaster planned to host a national final, although this was later scrapped for an internal selection. A pair of panels determined the representative for the Eurovision Song Contest, with a Slovenian panel picking five finalists and an international panel choosing the final song out of the five finalists. On 12 December 2023, Raiven was officially announced as the Slovenian representative for the Eurovision Song Contest 2024. The song was released on 20 January 2024, along with a music video.

=== At Eurovision ===
The Eurovision Song Contest 2024 took place at the Malmö Arena in Malmö, Sweden, and consisted of two semi-finals held on the respective dates of 7 and 9 May and the final on 11 May 2024. During the allocation draw on 30 January 2024, Slovenia was drawn to compete in the first semi-final, performing in the second half of the show. She was later drawn to perform ninth in the semi-final, ahead of Iceland's Hera Björk and before Finland's Teemu Keisteri.

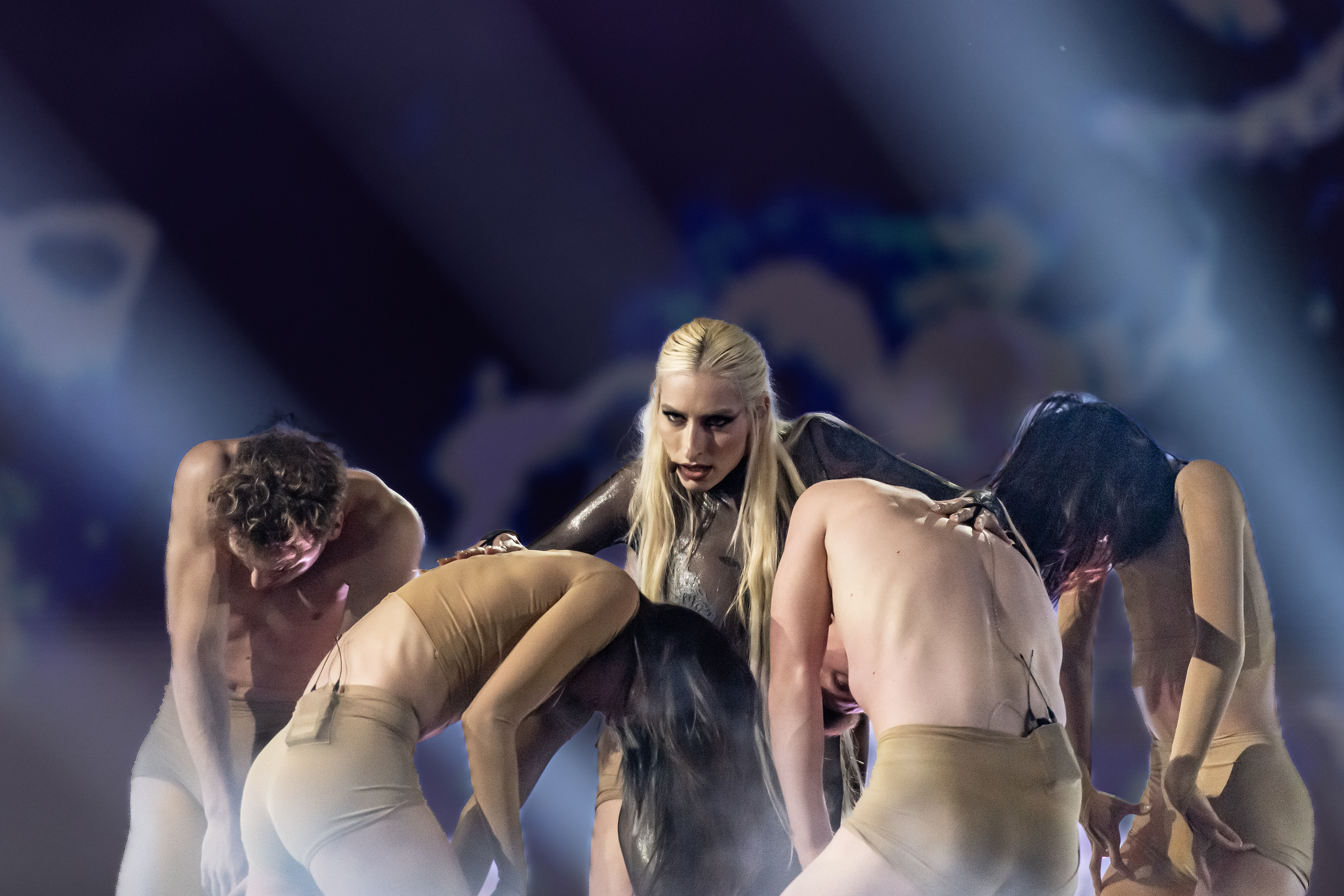
Raiven performing "Veronika" during a dress rehearsal before the first semi-final of Eurovision 2024.

For its Eurovision performance, Nejc Levstik was appointed as the creative director. Before the contest, Raiven announced intentions to heavily base the performance off of the song's music video and its "femininity, darkness and mystery". She also stated desires to emulate Veronika of Desenice in her performance. The performance featured Raiven in a transparent black outfit adorned with silver leaves. Five backing dancers accompanying her, all wearing "nude" bodysuits. The dancers were described by Raiven to be "my children…they’re like my little creatures that I brought from the underworld when Veronika rose up from the ground". The use of fog and wind effects were also implemented. "Veronika" finished ninth, scoring 51 points and securing a position in the grand final. In response to her qualification, Raiven, who was predicted by bookmakers to not qualify, stated to Delo, "I didn't even expect to be in the finals... since everyone mentioned them, I began to doubt myself."

Raiven performed a repeat of her performance in the grand final on 11 May. The song was performed 22nd, ahead of Switzerland's Nemo and before Croatia's Baby Lasagna. After the results were announced, she finished in 23rd with 27 points, with a split score of 15 points from juries and 12 points from public televoting. No sets of the maximum 12 points were given by any country in both groups. The country that gave the most in either category was Croatia, who gave a set of 10 points in both categories.

== Track listing ==
Digital download/streaming

1. "Veronika" – 2:46

Digital download/streaming – Acoustic Session

1. "Veronika" (Acoustic Session) – 2:56

Digital download/streaming – Orchestral version

1. "Veronika" (Orchestral Version) – 3:01

== Charts ==
Chart performance for "Veronika"
Chart (2024)	Peak position
Lithuania (AGATA)	72

== Release history ==
Release history and formats for "Veronika"
Country	Date	Format(s)	Version	Label	Ref.
Various	20 January 2024	Digital download; streaming	Original	Virgin Music	
Various	28 April 2024	Digital download; streaming	Acoustic Session	Virgin Music	
Various	13 May 2025	Digital download; streaming	Orchestral	Self-released	
