= Veronika of Desenice =

Second wife of Frederick II, Count of Celje

- Countess of Celje; Princess of the Holy Roman Empire
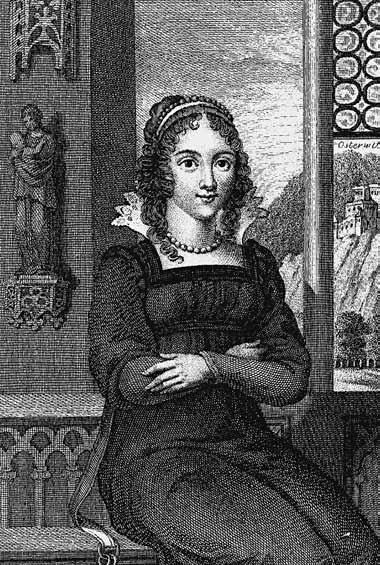
- Veronika of Desinić (1817)
- Died: October 17, 1425; Castle Veliki Tabor, Desinić, Croatia
- Spouse: Frederick II, Count of Celje

Veronika of Desenice (Slovene: Veronika Deseniška or Veronika z Desenic, Croatian: Veronika Desinićka, lit. 'Veronika of Desinić'; died 17 October 1425) was the second wife of Frederick II, Count of Celje. She is known for having been subjected to a witch trial by her father-in-law, who objected to her marriage to his son, but failed to have her condemned and instead had her imprisoned and murdered.

== Early life ==
Little is known of her early life. It has been believed the name Deseniška derives from the village of Desinić in Croatia, where Frederick also had extensive estates, and it appears in the forms Dessnitz, Dessenitz, Desnicze, Teschnitz, Teschenitz, and Dessewitz in various historical sources. However, more recent findings indicate that the name Deseniška derives from the village of Dišnik. The non-existent toponym Desenice is a back-formation from the adjective Deseniška.

She was possibly employed as a lady's maid to Elizabeth of Frankopan, the first wife of Frederick II, Count of Celje.

== Marriage and persecution ==
When Elizabeth of Frankopan suddenly died in 1422, Frederick was accused of having murdered her to be able to marry his mistress Veronika, and Frederick's father Hermann II, Count of Celje, accused his son of having committed adultery with Veronika.

Frederick negotiated with the Republic of Venice to assure protection for him and Veronika; his negotiations proved successful in 1425, and the same year, he married Veronika against the will of his father as well as the Emperor Sigismund. Veronika was of lesser status, and Frederick's father Hermann II was greatly opposed to the marriage.

Emperor Sigismund called upon Frederick, and on his arrival had him captured and returned to his father. The chronicles of the Counts of Celje suggest he had his son arrested and, while holding him prisoner, initiated a witch trial against Veronika, accusing her of having enchanted Frederick and attempted to murder Hermann II by poison. The witch trial failed; provided with good defense, she was acquitted by the court on lack of evidence.

== Murder ==
Despite the court's ruling, her father-in-law had her incarcerated in Ojstrica Castle near Tabor where she was murdered, supposedly on the orders of Hermann II, who reportedly ordered his knight Jobst von Helfenberg to drown her in a bath on 17 October 1425.

She was buried in Braslovče, and a few years later, Frederick arranged for her remains to be reburied at the Carthusian monastery at Jurklošter and in her memory also made an endowment to the monastery at Bistra.

== In culture ==
Veronika and Frederick's tragic love story, which also marked the beginning of the end of the House of Cilli, has been an inspiration for numerous literary creations.

Among others, she was the protagonist of Josipina Turnograjska's 1851 story Nedolžnost in sila (Innocence and Force; named Veronika Desinska), Josip Jurčič's 1880 play Veronika Deseniška, Oton Župančič's 1924 play Veronika Deseniška, Bratko Kreft's 1932 play Celjski Grofje (The Counts of Celje), Danilo Švara's 1946 opera Veronika Deseniška, Franček Rudolf's 1968 play Celjski grof na žrebcu (The Count of Celje on a Stallion) and 1974 play Veronika, Dušan Čater's 1996 children's novel Veronika Deseniška, and Leon Firšt's 2016 musical Veronika Deseniška. She has also inspired works in Croatian, German, Czech, and Italian.

The Veronika Poetry Award and the Veronika Festival are named after Veronika of Desenice.

The Slovene entry for the Eurovision Song Contest 2024, performed by Raiven, is titled after Veronika.

It was reported in 2025 that Urška Djukić, the director of Little Trouble Girls, was working on a new film based on the life of Veronika of Desenice.

== See also ==
- Counts of Celje
