= Raiven =

Slovenian singer

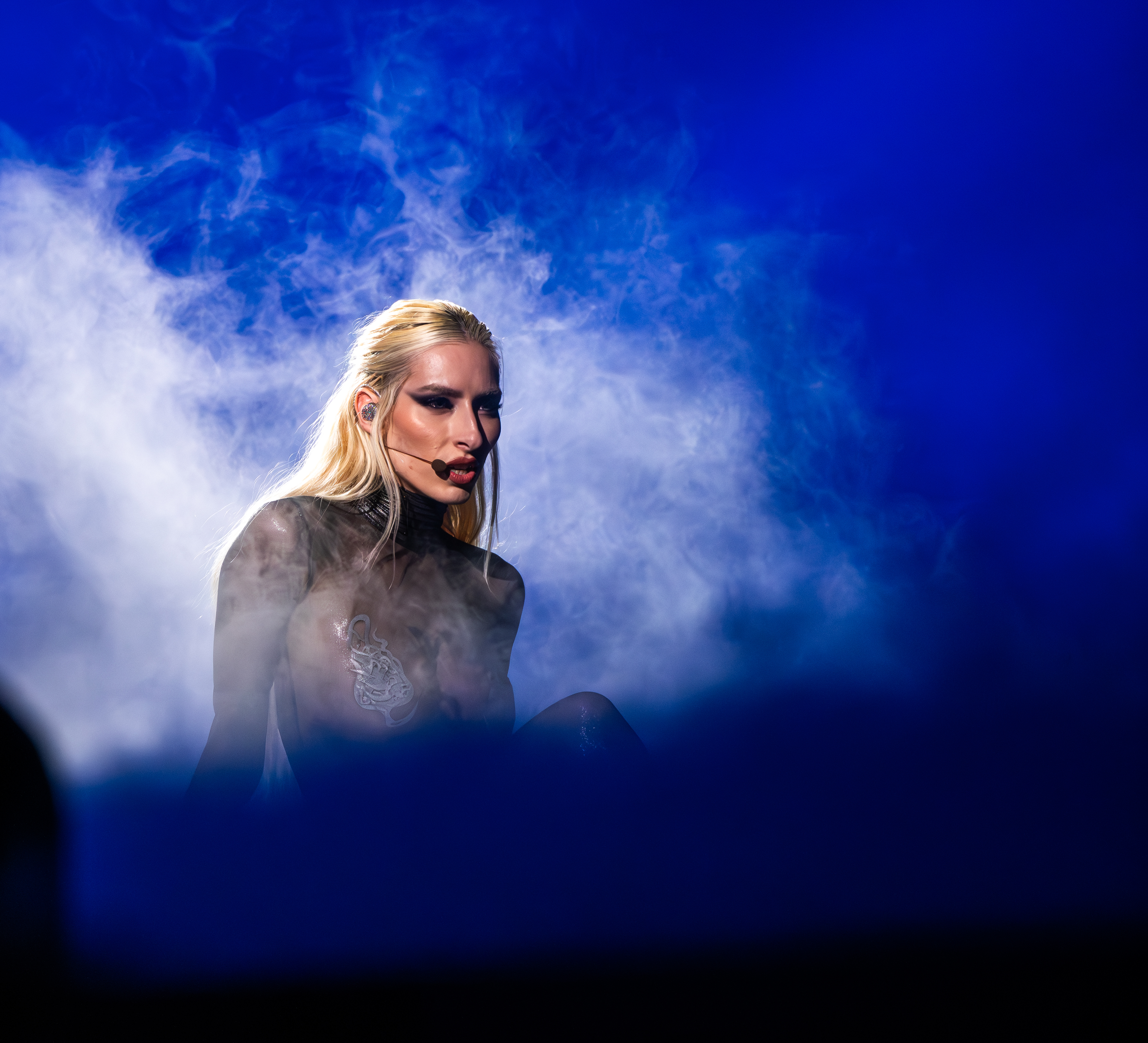
- Raiven performing in 2024

Background information
- Born: Sara Briški Cirman; 26 April 1996 (age 30); Ljubljana, Slovenia
- Genres: Pop; electropop; alternative; opera; electro opera
- Occupations: Singer; mezzo-soprano; songwriter; harpist
- Instruments: Vocals; harp
- Years active: 2014–present

Sara Briški Cirman (born 26 April 1996), better known by her stage name Raiven, is a Slovenian singer, songwriter, and harpist. She represented Slovenia at the Eurovision Song Contest 2024 with the song "Veronika". She first garnered wide recognition while competing to participate in the Eurovision Song Contest 2016 for Slovenia during the national final Evrovizijska Melodija (EMA) with the song "Črno bel", where she placed second. Raiven went on to return to EMA in 2017, placing third with the song "Zažarim", and has competed again in 2019 with the song "Kaos", placing second.

== Education ==
Sara Briški Cirman started her musical path at the age of four, when she enrolled at the Glasbena Matica in Ljubljana. Between 2002 and 2011 she attended harp lessons at the Music School in Ljubljana. She continued her education in the program of the Art Gymnasium, which she attended at the Maribor Conservatory of Music and Ballet, majoring in harp with Professor Dalibor Bernatovič, jazz singing with Ana Bezjak and solo singing with professors Leona Bašovič and Tina Bohak. She has been awarded several times for her achievements in the field of classical music. Among other awards, in 2013 she won first place at the Antonio Salieri International Harp Competition in Italy and a gold plaque at the Temsig Solo Singing Country Competition. In 2015 she graduated in solo singing and continued her music education at the Academy of Music in Ljubljana (solo singing - opera), where she graduated in 2018 in the class of Professor Alenka Dernač Bunta and enrolled in a master's degree in solo singing with Professor Pija Brodnik. In 2021 she received her master's degree in solo singing - opera.

== Career ==
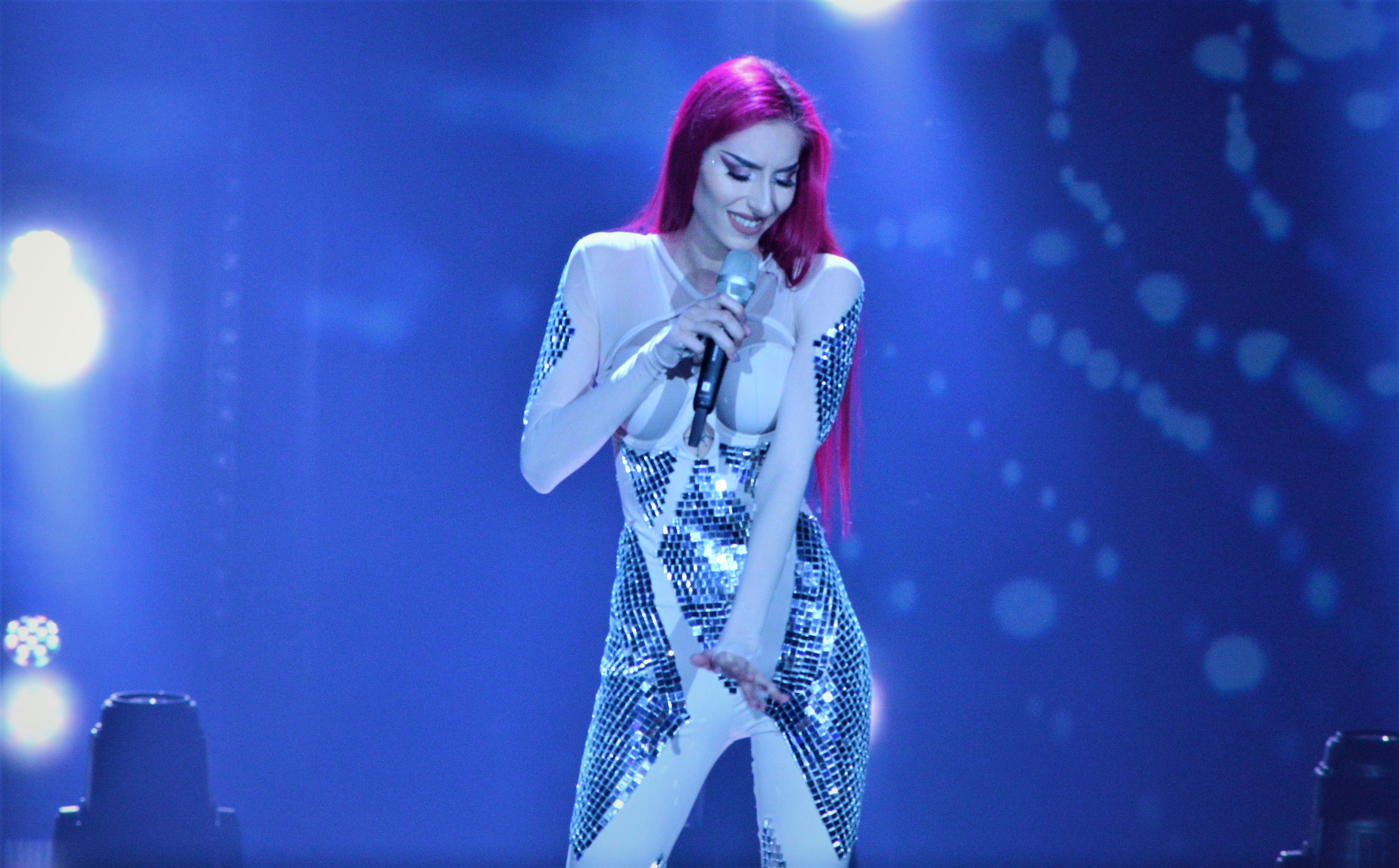
Raiven performing during Evrovizijska Melodija in February 2017

She released her debut album Magenta in 2017 and later received an award, given out by the Slovenian cultural and artistic association for achievements in Slovenian popular music Zlata piščal in the category record of the year. In the second half of 2018 she began working with songwriters and producers in Metropolis Studios (London). As a result of her work there, she released an EP album REM, which has received critical and public acclaim.

On July 4, 2019, she performed on the Fusion Stage at the Exit Festival in Novi Sad, on the evening when the organizers listed the most visitors in the history of the festival - over 56,000. At the end of 2019, she performed at numerous high-profile events, including as a soloist with the RTV Slovenia Symphony Orchestra, the RTV Slovenia Big Band, the Slovenian Baroque Orchestra and the Slovenian Police Orchestra. In February 2020, she performed with her original composition Ti with the RTV Slovenia Symphony Orchestra at the Ljubljana Slovene National Theatre Opera and Ballet, under the baton and adaptation of Matija Krečič.

On 11 September 2021, she performed the song Volkovi at the Popevka 21 festival, with which she won the Grand Audience Award causing her song to receive the title Popevka 2021. In 2021 she also finished her master's degree in the Ljubljana's Academy of Music, majoring in opera - solo singing.

=== Opera ===
In 2019 she dedicated herself to artistic development as an opera singer and in December 2019 she sang in the world's first tamburitza opera, Ambrož and Katarina. She is a scholarship holder of the Berlin Opera Academy. Her role Hänsl in Engelbert Humperdinck's opera Hänsel und Gretel was set to premiere in the summer of 2020, but it has been postponed to the summer of 2022 due to a new coronavirus pandemic.

In June 2021, she sang the role of Old Lady in Leonard Bernstein's opera Candide at the Cankar Centre. In April 2021, she received first prize and third place at the IMMCC 2020 International Singing Competition. On June 28, 2021, she received her master's degree with a singing recital and a master's essay entitled The Role of Agrippina in George Frideric Handel's opera of the same name. For her outstanding artistic achievements she received the Prešeren Prize for Students presented by the Academy of Music.

In August 2021, she performed in the role of Rosina at concert performances of Gioachino Rossini's The Barber of Seville under the direction of maestro George Pehlivanian. In October 2021, together with soprano Pia Brodnik, tenor Gregor Ravnik and pianist Andreja Kosmač, she performed a concert as part of the Studenec Summer Festival entitled Jesenska pesem (Autumn Song). Earlier, she performed twice as part of baroque music concerts with the Slovenian Baroque Orchestra under the baton of Egon Mihajlović and concert master Monika Toth.

At the end of October 2021, accompanied by Maltese Philharmonic Orchestra, she sang at an opera aria concert at the Astra Theater in Malta, conducted by José Cura.

In April 2022, she sang the title role in Handel's opera Agrippina at the Cankar Center under the artistic direction of Egon Mihajlović and directed by Rocc. In the same month she also sang at the closing concert of the Opernfest Prague at the Vinohrady Theater in Prague, under the direction of the artistic director of the Prague Opera, maestro Jaroslav Kyzlink. A week later, she sang with the Albanian Opera Orchestra in Tirana at the Marie Kraja Opera Festival, under the baton of maestro Martin Andrea. In 2022, she began studying the role of Carmen as part of a concert performance of the opera under the direction of maestro George Pehlivanian. That same year, she made her debut at the Slovenian National Theatre Opera and Ballet Ljubljana in the show 'Orpheus in the Underworld' (playing the role of Public Opinion), and in 2023, she portrayed Larina in the play 'Eugene Onegin'.

As part of her studies she performed Mozart's Spatzenmesse and Vivaldi's Gloria in D major in the Slovenian Philharmonic Orchestra as solo alto with the Baroque Orchestra of the Academy of Music in 2018. In the same year, she performed as a soloist at the Cankar Center with the Big Band of the Academy of Music, under the baton of Matej Hotko. In 2019, she sang the role of Iztok Kocen's mini-opera doctor Nepotrebna (Unnecessary), which premiered in Budapest. The mini-opera was presented in Brno and Ljubljana.

Since the beginning of her music education, she has regularly attended seminars by renowned musicians such as José Cura, Bernarda Fink, Vlatka Orašanić and JD Walker.

In 2022, she presented a new electro-opera concert project, in which she combined classical opera arias with electronic pop. Part of this project, entitled Doloroso, was presented at a sold-out concert on March 8, 2022, at the Cankar Centre. She returned to the Popevka festival in 2023 as a hostess, and together with her co-host Helena Blagne, she introduced her new song "Ikona". With it, she announced the release of the EP Sirene. Her Eurovision 2024 song "Veronika" is included in the album.

=== Eurovision ===
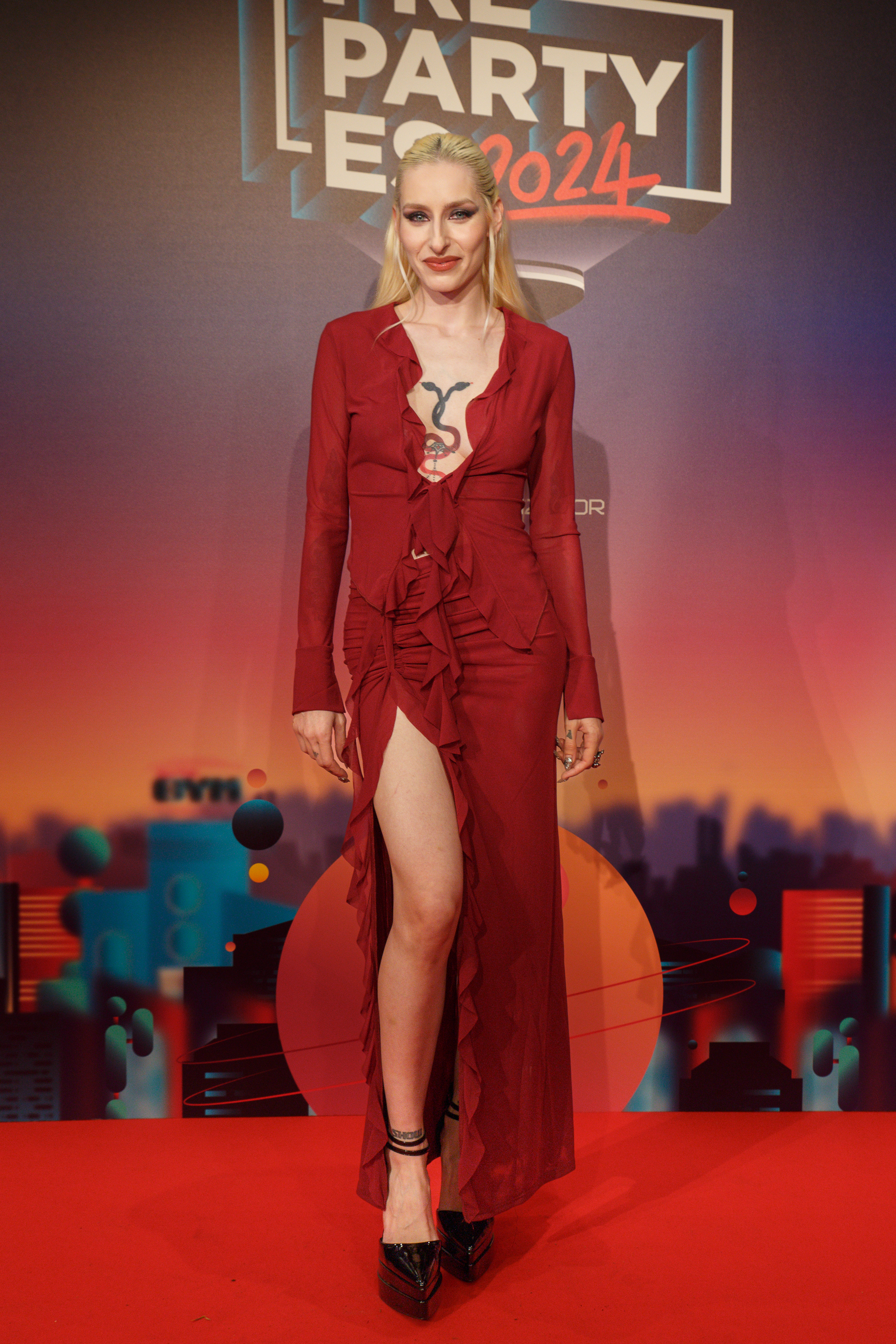
Raiven at the 2024 Barcelona Eurovision Party

Raiven participated in the national final Evrovizijska Melodija (EMA), the selection process for Slovenia in the Eurovision Song Contest 2016 with the song "Črno bel", placing second. Raiven returned to EMA in 2017, placing third with the song "Zažarim", and again in 2019 with the song "Kaos", placing second.

In December 2023, it was announced that Raiven would finally represent Slovenia in the Eurovision Song Contest 2024 with the song "Veronika". She qualified for the Grand Final on 7 May 2024 from the first semi-final. In the Grand Final on 11 May, "Veronika" placed 23rd out of 25 with 27 points (15 from the professional juries and 12 from the televoting).

=== Theater ===
In 2018, she also performed on theatrical boards in the play Trojanke, produced by the Slovenian National Theatre Nova Gorica, where she portrayed the character of Cassandra. The work in the new translation by Jere Ivanc was directed by Jaša Koceli.

In 2021, she accepted the main role of Urška in the musical Povodni mož (The Water Man).

== Discography ==
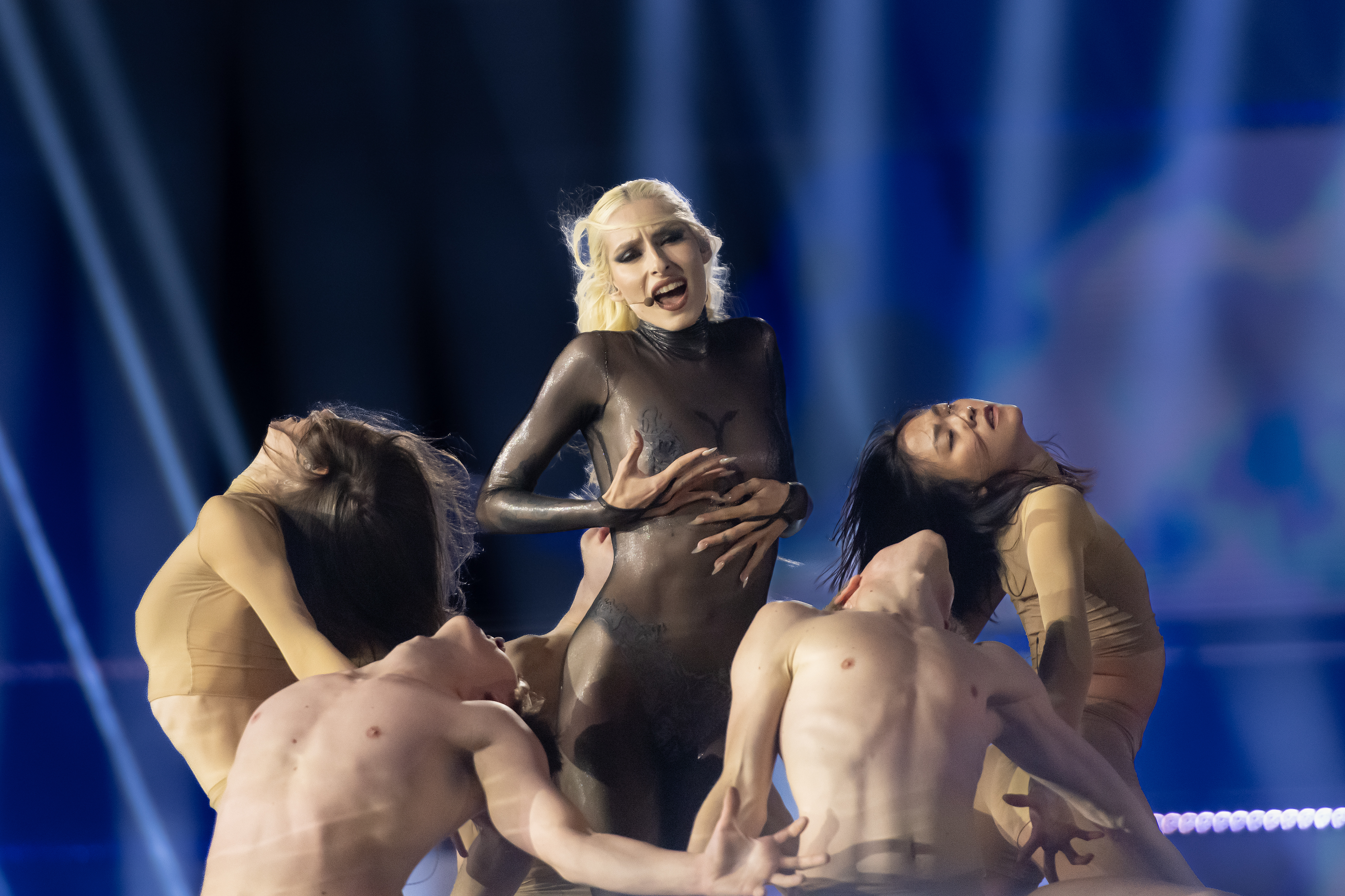
Raiven performing "Veronika" at Eurovision 2024

=== Albums ===
Title	Album details
Magenta	Released: 19 July 2017; Label: Spinnup; Formats: CD, streaming, digital download

=== Extended plays ===
Title	Details
REM	Released: 17 February 2019; Label: Self-released; Formats: Streaming, digital download
Sirene, Pt. 1	Released: 17 February 2024; Label: Self-released; Formats: Streaming, digital download

=== Singles ===
Title	Year	Peak chart positions		Album or EP
Title	Year	SLO	LTU	Album or EP
"Jadra"	2014	—	—	Magenta
"Bežim"	2015	—	—	Magenta
"Črno bel"	2016	42	—	Magenta
"Nov planet"	2016	—	—	Magenta
"Zažarim"	2017	—	—	Magenta
"Nisem kriva"	2018	—	—	Non-album single
"Kaos"	2019	—	—	REM
"Širni ocean"	2019	—	—	REM
"Kralj Babilona"	2019	—	—	REM
"Ti"	2019	—	—	Non-album singles
"Volkovi"	2021	—	—	Non-album singles
"Habanera"	2022	—	—	Sirene, Pt. 1
"Ikona"	2023	—	—	Sirene, Pt. 1
"Veronika"	2024	—	72	Sirene, Pt. 1
"Ofelija"	2024	—	—	Sirene, Pt. 1
"Mama"	2024	—	—	Non-album singles
"Hedonista"	2025	—	—	Non-album singles
"Reverie"	2025	—	—	Non-album singles
"Tandem" (with Macha Ravel)	2026	—	—	Non-album singles
"2009"	2026	—	—	Non-album singles
"—" denotes a recording that did not chart or was not released in that territory.

== Awards and achievements ==
Name of the song competition, year of competing, work presented, and the result
Year	Competition	Work	Result	Ref.
2016	EMA	Črno bel	Runner-up	
2017	EMA	Zažarim	Third place	
2019	EMA	KAOS	Runner-up	
2021	Slovenian song festival	Volkovi	Winner	
2024	Eurovision Song Contest 2024	Veronika	23rd place	

Name of the award ceremony, year presented, nominated work, category, and the result
Year	Award	Nominee/work	Category	Result	Ref.
2017	Zlata piščal	Nov planet	Song of the Year	Nominated	
2018	Zlata piščal	Povej	Song of the Year	Nominated	
2018	Zlata piščal	Raiven	Artist of the Year	Nominated	
2018	Zlata piščal	Magenta	Album of the Year	Won	
2022	My Global Fashion Award	Raiven	Regional Fashion Icon	Won	
2024	Eurovision Awards	Raiven	Style Icon	Nominated	

Awards and achievements
Preceded by Joker Out with "Carpe Diem"	Slovenia in the Eurovision Song Contest; 2024	Succeeded by Klemen with "How Much Time Do We Have Left?"
