= Dušan Čater =

Slovene writer, editor and translator

- Born: 1968 (age 57–58); Celje, Socialist Federal Republic of Yugoslavia (now in Slovenia)
- Education: Faculty of Social Sciences, Ljubljana
- Occupations: writer, editor, translator
- Writing career
- Notable works: Flash royal, Ata je spet pijan, Džehenem
- Notable awards: Fabula Award; 2012 for Džehenem

Dušan Čater (born 1968) is a Slovene writer, editor and translator. He has published six novels, two of which have also been translated and published in Croatian.

Čater was born in Celje in 1968. He studied journalism and sociology at the University of Ljubljana and works as a freelance writer and translator. He has also written a number of books for children based on traditional stories and legends about figures like Kralj Matjaž, Peter Klepec and Veronika of Desenice.

Čater won the 2012 Fabula Award for Džehenem (Jahannam).

== Novels ==
- Flash Royal (1994)
- Imitacija (Imitation) (1996)
- Resnični umori (Real Murders) (1997)
- Patosi (Pathoses) (1999)
- Ata je spet pijan (Pop's Drunk Again) (2002)
- Džehenem (Jahannam) (2010)

== Children's books and youth literature ==
- Peter Klepec (1995)
- Kralj Matjaž (1996)
- Veronika Deseniška (1996)
- Pojdi z mano (2009)

== Monographs ==
- Marilyn Monroe (1994)
- Casanova (1994)
- Oscar Wilde (1995)
- The Doors (2000)
