= Ata je spet pijan =

2002 novel by Dušan Čater

- Author: Dušan Čater
- Language: Slovenian
- Genre: social novel
- Publisher: Študentska založba
- Publication date: 2002
- Publication place: Slovenia
- ISBN: 961-6356-79-8

Ata je spet pijan (Dad is drunk again) is a Slovenian novel by Slovenian author Dušan Čater. It was first published in 2002.

== Plot ==
The novel is written as a memory, from a distance, surrounded by a story from Latin America, where the first-person narrator Čatko fled from his native Slovenia because of the problems he got into. Namely, Ata Čatko is engaged in dirty business of forced recovery of money. He usually takes her away without any unpleasant consequences, but this time one of the recovered people recognized him in the newspaper and threatened him. In order to protect his otherwise neglected family, his father kills the person and takes him to Argentina, saying goodbye to his exciting life, which in the "new world" now represents living with a good drink, white powder and women. He can't go home, otherwise he doesn't even think about it. His wife Lola and son Tin are waiting for him at home, as well as his constant mistress, many coincidences, beer friends, bohemians, and last but not least, colleagues in the "profession" - mafia debt collectors.

== See also ==
- List of Slovenian novels
