= Ditka Čepin =

Slovenian singer and songwriter (born 1993)

Ditka
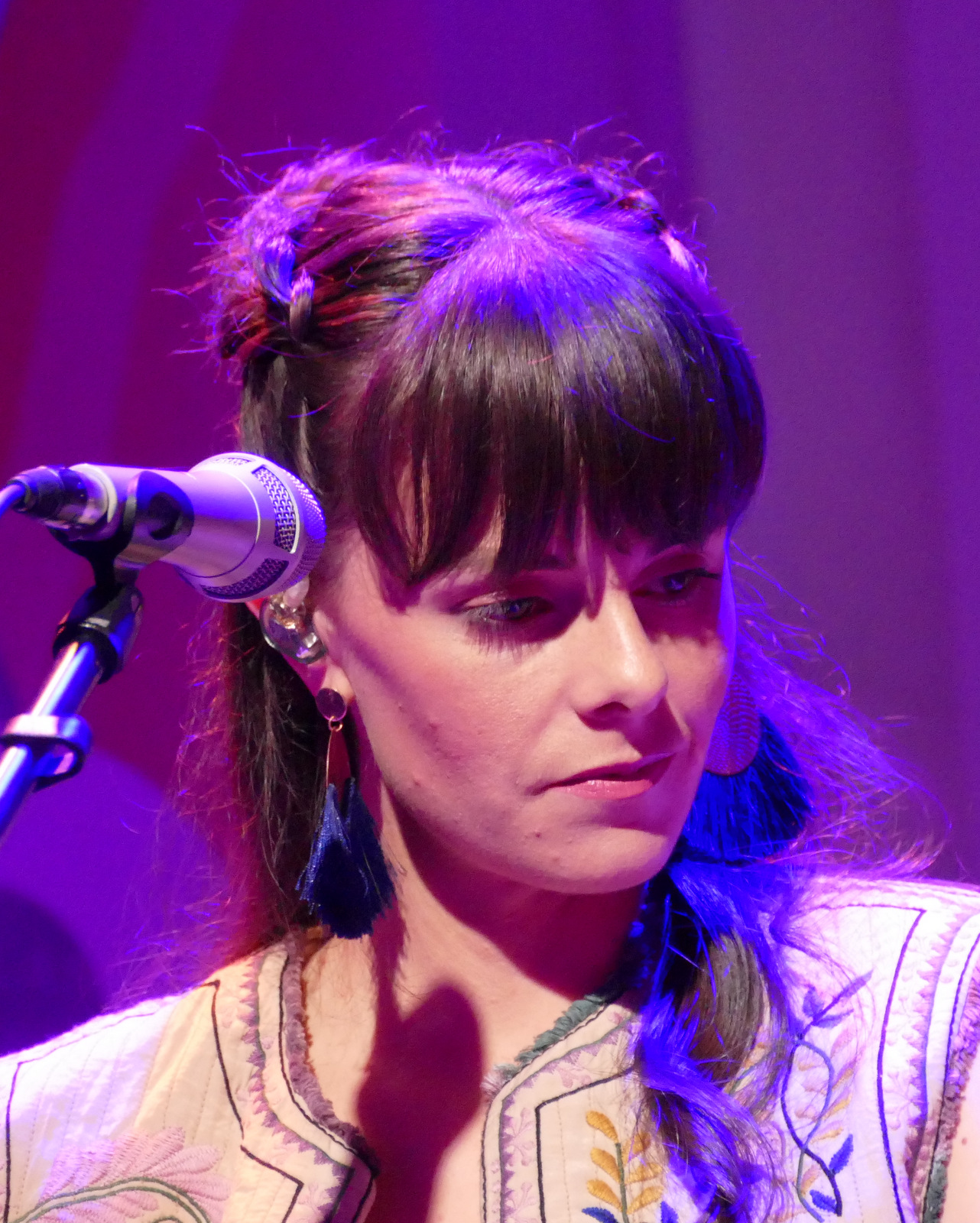
- Čepin in 2023

Background information
- Born: 4 July 1993 (age 33); Slovenj Gradec, Slovenia
- Occupations: Singer; songwriter

Edita Čepin (born 4 July 1993), known professionally as Ditka, is a Slovenian singer and songwriter.

== Musical career ==
Ditka began her musical career at the age of nine, when in 2002 she wrote her first song entitled "V deželi mojih sanj" and presented it at the children's festival Kristalček in Rogaška Slatina. During her childhood and teenage years, she regularly participated in the FENS music festival in Izola, where she won in 2005 with the song Album s slikami. The songs from the beginning of her career were written by her father Gorazd Čepin, a music professor, pianist, composer and singer, who remains Ditka's mentor, the author of the arrangements of all her songs and a permanent member of her accompanying musical band. In 2010, she sent her original song So Fine to radio stations, which was included in the compilation "Imamo dobro glasbo" by Radio Val 202, and the song also made it to the semi-finals of the "Songwriting Contest" in England.

Ditka became known to the wider Slovenian public in 2013 with the song "Ne bodi kot drugi", a poem by Feri Lainšček, set to music by Gorazd Čepin. The musical story she writes today is a combination of poetry set to music by renowned Slovenian poets (Feri Lainšček, Tone Pavček, Ciril Zlobec, Kajetan Kovič, Janez Menart, Srečko Kosovel, Karel Destovnik Kajuh) and original music in English. Ditka has released six albums so far: "In the Land of My Dreams" (2004), "Don't Be Like Others" (2013), "Don't Change Me" (2016), "Don't Be What You Are Not" (2019), "Ditka 10 "Live&Unplugged"" (2021) and "An Angel Between Us" (2022). The "Don't Be What You Are Not" tour was selected among the Top 3 tours of 2019 according to MMC RTV SLO.

Under the name Ditka int. (Ditka International), Ditka also creates in English. In 2013, she reached the finals of the English competition "UK Songwriting Contest" with her original song "Dreamer", in 2016 she reached the semi-finals of the American competition "Unsigned Only" with her song "Silence", and in 2019 she became the winner of the largest international singer-songwriter competition in Bulgaria ("Sofia Singer Songwriter Festival 2019"). In 2021 she collaborated on the song "Cold Heart" with British producer Stuart Epps, a record producer of several musicians from the world music scene.

All of Ditka's songs and albums have been released on the self-published GOGO MUSIC. She and her father Gorazd are the authors of the music to the poetry, the author of the English lyrics is Ditka, the author of all the arrangements of her songs, with the exception of the song "Cold Heart", is Gorazd Čepin.

== Discography ==
- 2004 − V deželi mojih sanj (CD)
- 2011 − My Guitar (CD)
- 2013 − Ne bodi kot drugi (CD)
- 2016 − Ne spreminjaj se (CD)
- 2019 − Ne bodi, kar nisi (CD)
- 2020 − Ditka 10 »Live&Unplugged« (LP)
- 2022 − Med nama je angel (CD)
