= Slovenia in the Eurovision Song Contest 2023 =

- Eurovision Song Contest 2023
- Participating broadcaster: Radiotelevizija Slovenija (RTVSLO)
- Country: Slovenia
- Selection process: Internal selection
- Announcement date: Artist: 8 December 2022; Song: 4 February 2023

Competing entry
- Song: "Carpe Diem"
- Artist: Joker Out
- Songwriters: Bojan Cvjetićanin; Jan Peteh; Jure Maček; Kris Guštin; Nace Jordan; Žarko Pak

Placement
- Semi-final result: Qualified (5th, 103 points)
- Final result: 21st, 78 points

Participation chronology

Slovenia was represented at the Eurovision Song Contest 2023 with the song "Carpe Diem", written by band members Bojan Cvjetićanin, Jan Peteh, Jure Maček, Kris Guštin and Nace Jordan, alongside Žarko Pak, and performed by themselves as Joker Out. The Slovene participating broadcaster, Radiotelevizija Slovenija (RTVSLO), internally selected its entry for the contest. Joker Out were announced as the Slovenian entrants to the contest on 8 December 2022, whilst their song was presented to the public in a televised presentation show, Misija Liverpool, on 4 February 2023.

Slovenia was drawn to compete in the second semi-final of the Eurovision Song Contest which took place on 11 May 2023 and was later selected to perform in position 10. At the end of the show, "Carpe Diem" was announced among the top 10 entries of the second semi-final and hence qualified to compete in the final, marking Slovenia's first qualification to the final since 2019. It was later revealed that Slovenia placed fifth out of the sixteen participating countries in the semi-final with 103 points. In the final, Slovenia performed in position 24 and placed twenty-first out of the 26 participating countries, scoring a total of 78 points.

An average of 345,000 viewers watched the final in Slovenia, the highest viewing figures recorded since 2015 and the most watched show in Slovenia in 2023. In addition, peak viewing figures reached 895,300 – the highest total ever seen since Slovenia debuted in the Eurovision Song Contest in 1993.

== Background ==
Prior to the 2023 contest, Radiotelevizija Slovenija (RTVSLO) had participated in the Eurovision Song Contest representing Slovenia twenty-seven times since its first entry in 1993. Its highest placing in the contest, to this point, has been seventh place, which the nation achieved on two occasions: in 1995 with the song "Prisluhni mi" performed by Darja Švajger and in 2001 with the song "Energy" performed by Nuša Derenda. The country's only other top ten result was achieved in 1997 when Tanja Ribič performing "Zbudi se" placed tenth. Since the introduction of semi-finals to the format of the contest in 2004, Slovenia had thus far only managed to qualify to the final on six occasions. In 2022, "Disko" performed by LPS failed to qualify to the final, finishing in last place in the first semi-final with 15 points. This marked Slovenia's worst result at the contest in ten years.

As part of its duties as participating broadcaster, RTVSLO organises the selection of its entry in the Eurovision Song Contest and broadcasts the event in the country. Following the poor result in 2022, the broadcaster considered withdrawing from the contest in 2023. However, after discussions with the Music Commission of the Programme Council, RTVSLO opted against a withdrawal, and confirmed its participation in the 2023 contest on 15 September 2022. RTVSLO has traditionally selected its entry through a national final entitled Evrovizijska Melodija (EMA), which has been produced with variable formats, with the exceptions of 2013 and 2021 when the entry was internally selected. Despite initially confirming that EMA would be used to select the entry for the 2023 contest, the broadcaster later opted to forego the use of the national final in order to internally select the entry.

== Before Eurovision ==
=== Internal selection ===
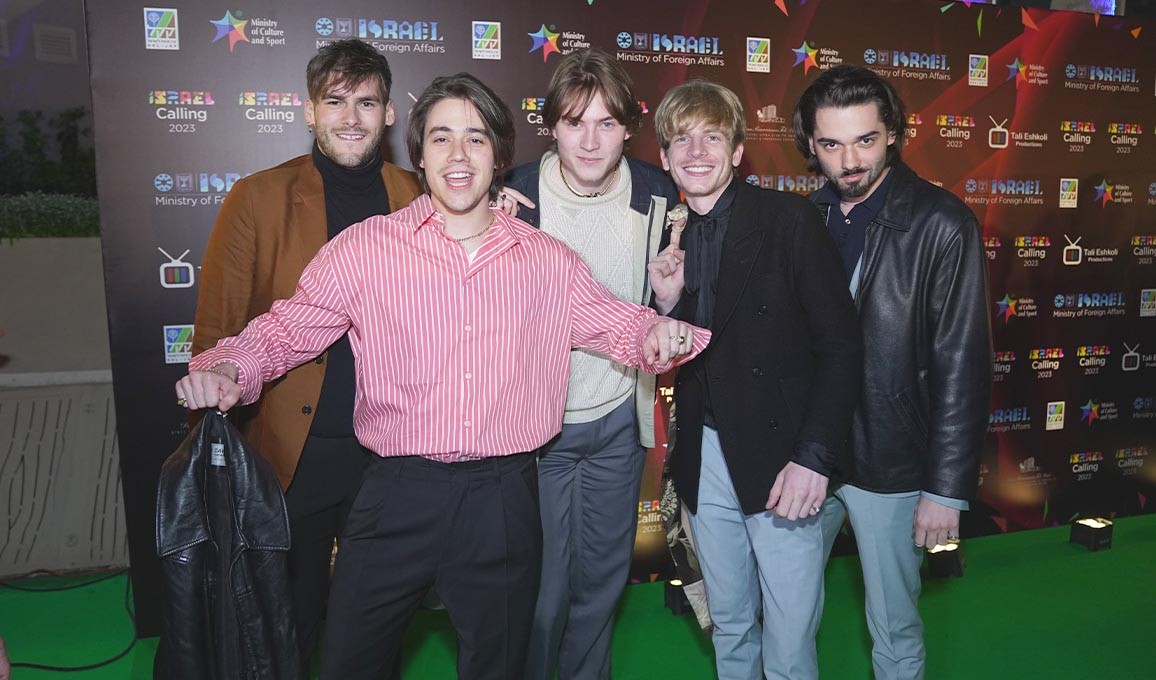
Joker Out were internally selected by Radiotelevizija Slovenija to represent Slovenia in Liverpool.

The Slovenian entry for the Eurovision Song Contest 2023 was selected internally by Radiotelevizija Slovenija, marking only the third time the broadcaster has internally selected their act for the contest. On 8 December 2022, the broadcaster announced that they had selected the band Joker Out to represent Slovenia in Liverpool during a special press conference held at the Ljubljana Botanical Gardens. Following the announcement of their selection as the Slovenian entrants, the band stated that "This is an offer we could not refuse. We talked about Eurovision years ago, but we were waiting for the right moment. This is obviously now. We are incredibly proud to represent Slovenia with our brand of music to show to the European stage". The Slovenian song was recorded in December 2022 in Hamburg, Germany. The band worked with Mark Pirc, Zarko Pak and Todd Burke during the recording process, with Pirc also acting as the creative producer for the entry's music video and showcase performance on the national TV, both completed in January 2023. "Carpe Diem" was announced as the title of the Slovenian entry on 28 January 2023.

"We decided to use a tried and tested form of national selection, namely the internal selection. We have chosen Joker Out, who, like Magnifico and the bands Siddharta and Big Foot Mama before them, bring good quality popular music to the Slovenian music scene to the delight of the broadest of audiences. We were looking for a good sound and popularity, and I’m convinced that we have found them."

— Vanja Vardjan, head of the Entertainment Division of RTV Slovenija

The selected song, "Carpe Diem", was presented to the public on 4 February 2023, during the special presentation show Misija Liverpool. The show was broadcast on TV SLO 1 and hosted by Miša Molk. In addition to the presentation of the Slovene entry, past Slovenian Eurovision entrants Amaya, who represented Slovenia in 2011; Filip Vidušin, lead singer of LPS, who represented Slovenia in 2022; Nuša Derenda, who represented Slovenia in 2001; and Tomaž Mihelič, who represented Slovenia in 2002 as a member of Sestre, performed live in a special anniversary performance dedicated to Slovenia's thirty years since first entering the contest. Konstrakta, who represented Serbia in the Eurovision Song Contest 2022, also performed live. The band also released the music video for the song, which was shot in Ljubljana at the Grand Hotel Union and directed by Bonino Englaro.

=== Promotion ===
In order to promote "Carpe Diem" as the Slovenian entry for the 2023 contest, Joker Out embarked on a promotional tour across Europe and Slovenia. They became the first Slovenian Eurovision entrants in history to attend all promotional parties. The band were the first to be confirmed as attending the Barcelona Eurovision Party on 8 April 2023. The band also appeared at pre-parties in Madrid, Tel Aviv, London, Warsaw and Amsterdam. On 9 March, the band revealed that they were recording an English-language version of "Carpe Diem", after approaching fans on Instagram, with the track later released on 31 March 2023. On 29 April 2023, the band travelled to Liverpool in order to film a music video to their new single "New Wave" in collaboration with English singer Elvis Costello. They appeared on several British radio stations including BBC Radio Merseyside. On 9 April 2023, "Carpe Diem" was played at Anfield before a Premier League football match between Liverpool and Arsenal. On 20 April 2023, RTVSLO held a press conference in Ljubljana, with Slovenian media having the opportunity to talk with Joker Out. The band also detailed their preparations for the contest and the concept of their staging plans with the BBC. The band also made several virtual appearances with media outlets in Croatia, Slovakia and Austria. On 25 April 2023, the band held a special concert in Prešeren Square, Ljubljana, where they performed a catalogue of songs including "Carpe Diem" in their final performance in Slovenia before departing for Liverpool. On 30 April 2023, the band also released a party version of the song, which was premiered on the Eurovision YouTube channel.

On 20 March 2023, the band began a weekly series documenting their preparations and journey to the Eurovision Song Contest across Europe, starting in Hamburg with the recording process and concluding with the band's final performance in Liverpool. On 11 May 2023, RTVSLO broadcast Pot v Liverpool on TV SLO 2, a special programme accounting Joker Out's journey to the contest. On 13 May 2023, a behind-the-scenes show was broadcast on TV SLO 1 with special backstage footage from Liverpool.

== At Eurovision ==
A video postcard introduced Joker Out's performance in the second semi-final and final of the Eurovision Song Contest 2023. The postcard was filmed at the headquarters of Radiotelevizija Slovenija in March 2023 in collaboration with the host broadcaster BBC. The Goodness Gracious Rooftop Bar in Liverpool and Tetris Hall rooftop in Kyiv also featured in the Slovenian postcard.

According to Eurovision 2023 rules, all nations with the exceptions of the reigning champion nation (Ukraine) and the "Big Five" (France, Germany, Italy, Spain and hosting country the United Kingdom) are required to qualify from one of two semi-finals in order to compete for the final; the top ten countries from each semi-final progress to the final. The European Broadcasting Union (EBU) split up the competing countries into six different pots based on voting patterns from previous contests, with countries with favourable voting histories put into the same pot. On 31 January 2023, an allocation draw was held, which placed each country into one of the two semi-finals, and determined which half of the show they would perform in. Slovenia was placed into the second semi-final, held on 11 May 2023, and was scheduled to perform in the second half of the show.

Once all the competing songs for the 2023 contest had been released, the running order for the semi-finals was decided by the shows' producers rather than through another draw, so that similar songs were not placed next to each other. Slovenia was set to perform in position 10, following the entry from Poland and before the entry from Georgia. Immediately after the close of the second semi-final, a press conference was held in which each of the artists drew the half of the final of which they would perform in. Slovenia was drawn into the second half of the final and was later selected by the EBU to perform in position number 24, following the entry from Israel and before the entry from Croatia.

In Slovenia, the semi-finals were broadcast on TV SLO 2 and the final was broadcast on TV SLO 1, with commentary by Andrej Hofer. The second semi-final and the final were also broadcast on Radio Maribor and Radio Val 202, with commentary of the second semi-final by Maja Stepančič, Maruša Kerec, Neja Jerant and Uršula Zaletelj, whilst radio coverage of the final featured commentary by Maja Stepančič, Miha Šalehar and Uršula Zaletelj. All shows were also screened on RTVSLO’s 4D online platform MMCŽivo with commentary by journalist Žana Čeh. The Slovenian spokesperson, who announced the top 12-point score awarded by the Slovenian jury during the final, was Melani Mekicar.

=== Semi-final ===
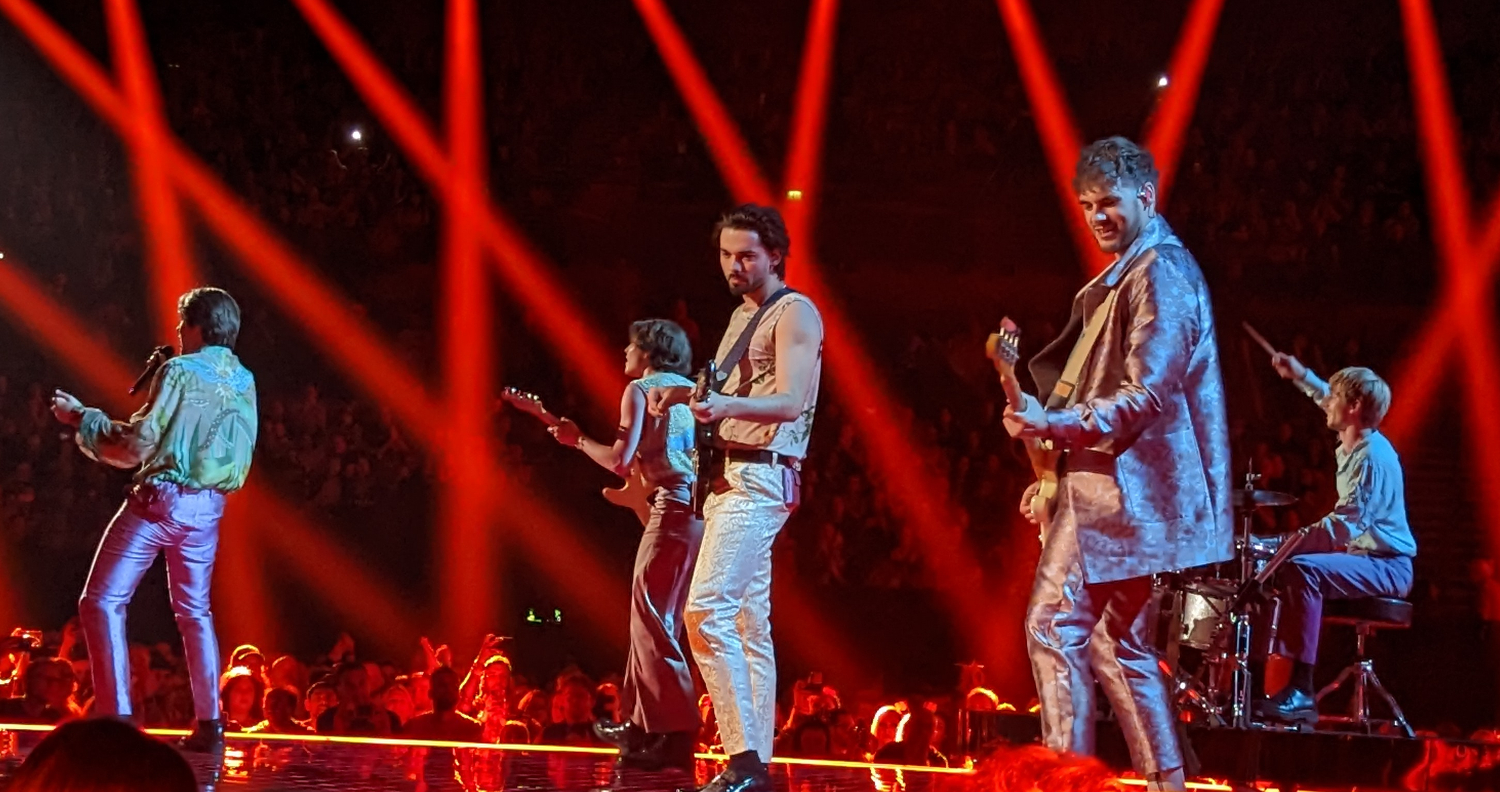
Joker Out during a rehearsal before the second semi-final

Joker Out took part in technical rehearsals on 2 and 5 May, followed by dress rehearsals on 10 and 11 May. This included the jury show on 10 May where the professional back-up juries of each country watched and voted in a result used if any issues with public televoting occurred.

Damir Raković, better known as Ponorelii, was the costumer designer for the band's performance, having previously designed outfits for Estelle, Severina, who represented Croatia in the Eurovision Song Contest 2006, Katarina Rešek, Senidah and Dino Merlin, who represented Bosnia and Herzegovina in the Eurovision Song Contest 1999 and 2011. He stated that, on the Eurovision stage, the Slovenian quintet would shine in light and romantic colours that match the melody of "Carpe Diem" and mark the thematic set of the Garden of Eden, symbolising the coming of the animal and plant world. Each of the band members were also accompanied by a different motif, with each of them having their own animal, plant and precious stone, which was sewn into an unobtrusive part of the costume. Ponorelii also played with natural dyes in the costume colours, fusing colours in accordance to their energy and personality, with each having their own lace. Ponorelii also collaborated with Slovenian Idrija lace designer Andraž Drobnič to bring a distinctly Slovene motive to the performance. Matic Zadravec also served as the choreographer for the Slovenian performance, having already worked with the band in Slovenia for several years.

During the Slovenian performance, dark red and black LED's dominated, with each band member interacting with each other for the entirety of the show. Lead singer Bojan Cvjetićanin stated that the band's aim is to create "a three-minute Joker Out concert" on stage, fusing "Slovene cultural heritage with a distinctly rock defining stage performance for Europe". At the end of the performance, each of the band members lined up at the front of the stage before bowing to the audience.

At the end of the show, Slovenia was announced as having finished in the top 10 and subsequently qualifying for the grand final. This marked the first time since 2019 that Slovenia qualified for the final of the contest. It was later revealed that Slovenia placed fifth out of the sixteen participating countries in the second semi-final with 103 points.

=== Final ===
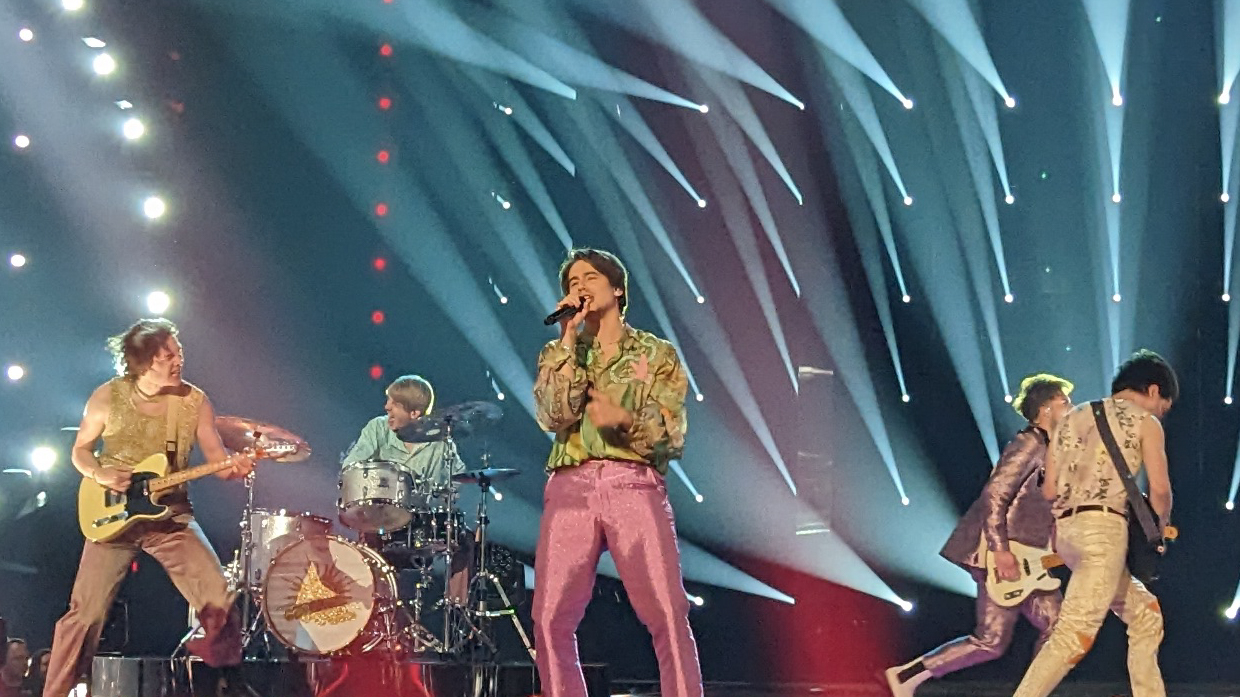
Joker Out during the jury final on 12 May 2023.

Shortly after the second semi-final, a winners' press conference was held for the ten qualifying countries. As part of this press conference, the qualifying artists took part in a draw to determine which half of the grand final they would subsequently participate in. This draw was done in the order the countries appeared in the semi-final running order. Slovenia was drawn to compete in the second half. Following this draw, the shows' producers decided upon the running order of the final, as they had done for the semi-finals. Slovenia was subsequently placed to perform in position number 24, following the entry from Israel and before the entry from Croatia.

Prior to the band's performance in the final, lead singer Bojan Cvjetićanin stated that "we felt so much more pressure as internally selected artists to represent Slovenia. Now we have reached the final, our aim is to continue representing Slovenia in the best possible way, hopefully achieving a good result for the country".

Joker Out once again took part in dress rehearsals on 12 and 13 May before the final, including the jury final where the professional juries cast their final votes before the live show on 12 May. They performed a repeat of their semi-final performance during the final on 13 May. Slovenia placed 21st in the final, scoring 78 points; 45 points from the public televoting and 33 points from the juries.

=== Voting ===
Below is a breakdown of points awarded to Slovenia in the second semi-final and in the final. Voting during the three shows involved each country awarding sets of points from 1-8, 10 and 12: one from their professional jury and the other from televoting in the final vote, while the semi-final vote was based entirely on the vote of the public. The exact composition of the professional jury, and the results of each country's jury and televoting were released after the final. The Slovenian jury consisted of Edita Čepin, Lara Baruca, Matjaž Vlašič, Hugo Smeh (Hyu) and Jernej Sobočan. In the second semi-final, Slovenia placed 5th with 103 points, receiving maximum twelve points from Poland, Romania and Spain. This marked the first Slovenian qualification to the final since 2019. In the final, Slovenia placed 21st with 78 points, receiving twelve points in the jury vote from Serbia and twelve points in the public televote from Croatia. Over the course of the contest, Slovenia awarded its 12 points to Albania in the second semi-final, and to Italy (jury) and Croatia (televote) in the final.

==== Points awarded to Slovenia ====
Points awarded to Slovenia (Semi-final 2)
Score	Televote
12 points	Poland; Romania; Spain
10 points	Austria
8 points	Australia
7 points	Estonia; Lithuania
6 points	Rest of the World; Ukraine
5 points	Armenia
4 points	Albania
3 points	Belgium; United Kingdom
2 points	Cyprus; Denmark; Greece
1 point	Georgia; Iceland

Points awarded to Slovenia (Final)
Score	Televote	Jury
12 points	Croatia	Serbia
10 points		
8 points	Serbia	
7 points	Finland	
6 points		Austria; Czech Republic
5 points	Azerbaijan	Croatia
4 points		
3 points	Czech Republic	Ukraine
2 points	Albania; Latvia; Poland; Romania	
1 point	Australia; Estonia	United Kingdom

==== Points awarded by Slovenia ====
Points awarded by Slovenia (Semi-final 2)
Score	Televote
12 points	Albania
10 points	Austria
8 points	Poland
7 points	Belgium
6 points	Australia
5 points	Estonia
4 points	Cyprus
3 points	Iceland
2 points	Lithuania
1 point	Armenia

Points awarded by Slovenia (Final)
Score	Televote	Jury
12 points	Croatia	Italy
10 points	Finland	Estonia
8 points	Italy	Lithuania
7 points	Albania	Sweden
6 points	Serbia	Czech Republic
5 points	Norway	Belgium
4 points	Sweden	Australia
3 points	France	Austria
2 points	Belgium	Spain
1 point	Poland	Switzerland

==== Detailed voting results ====
Each nation's jury consisted of five music industry professionals who are citizens of the country they represent, with their names published before the contest to ensure transparency. This jury judged each entry based on: vocal capacity; the stage performance; the song's composition and originality; and the overall impression by the act. In addition, no member of a national jury was permitted to be related in any way to any of the competing acts in such a way that they cannot vote impartially and independently. The individual rankings of each jury member as well as the nation's televoting results were released shortly after the grand final.

The following members comprised the Slovene jury:

- Hugo Smeh (Hyu) – music producer
- Jernej Sobočan Ivanovič – music editor at Radio Val 202
- Matjaž Vlašič – singer, guitarist, lyricist and pop music composer
- Edita Čepin – stage name Ditka, singer-songwriter and composer
- Lara Baruca – pop music singer and composer

Detailed voting results from Slovenia (Semi-final 2)
R/O	Country	Televote	
R/O	Country	Rank	Points
01	Denmark	12	
02	Armenia	10	1
03	Romania	14	
04	Estonia	6	5
05	Belgium	4	7
06	Cyprus	7	4
07	Iceland	8	3
08	Greece	13	
09	Poland	3	8
10	Slovenia		
11	Georgia	11	
12	San Marino	15	
13	Austria	2	10
14	Albania	1	12
15	Lithuania	9	2
16	Australia	5	6

Detailed voting results from Slovenia (Final)
R/O	Country	Jury							Televote	
R/O	Country	Juror 1	Juror 2	Juror 3	Juror 4	Juror 5	Rank	Points	Rank	Points
01	Austria	4	7	12	5	11	8	3	17	
02	Portugal	21	15	14	14	9	18		21	
03	Switzerland	25	3	17	10	7	10	1	15	
04	Poland	22	11	25	24	10	20		10	1
05	Serbia	24	20	18	21	20	25		5	6
06	France	13	14	8	25	18	17		8	3
07	Cyprus	19	4	19	9	8	13		16	
08	Spain	2	13	9	15	19	9	2	24	
09	Sweden	8	8	11	2	3	4	7	7	4
10	Albania	18	19	13	22	17	22		4	7
11	Italy	1	6	16	1	1	1	12	3	8
12	Estonia	11	2	3	4	2	2	10	20	
13	Finland	12	18	20	8	6	14		2	10
14	Czech Republic	3	10	4	7	23	5	6	12	
15	Australia	9	17	2	19	4	7	4	19	
16	Belgium	10	16	1	6	13	6	5	9	2
17	Armenia	5	9	7	13	22	12		22	
18	Moldova	15	25	21	12	25	23		14	
19	Ukraine	6	23	15	16	15	16		13	
20	Norway	7	21	24	17	21	19		6	5
21	Germany	23	22	10	20	14	21		18	
22	Lithuania	14	1	6	3	12	3	8	23	
23	Israel	20	5	23	18	16	15		11	
24	Slovenia									
25	Croatia	17	24	5	11	5	11		1	12
26	United Kingdom	16	12	22	23	24	24		25	

== After Eurovision ==
Following the contest, Joker Out were praised in Slovenian media for their qualification to the final, with the show becoming the most watched Eurovision final in Slovenia since 2015. An average of 345,000 viewers watched the final on TV SLO 1, with a peak viewing figure of 895,300 viewers - a peak viewing share of 55%. This marked the highest ever viewing levels recorded in Slovenia since the country's debut in the Eurovision Song Contest.

Following their placing, the band stated that "the result is not the best, we have to admit that, but the impression we left on the arena was very good". They also emphasised that the band was proud of their performance: "We couldn't have done more than what we are. It is a truly unique experience. But we are extremely grateful that we were able to experience it once in our lives". On 19 May 2023, the band announced their first international tour across Slovenia, Croatia, Serbia, Bosnia and Herzegovina, the United Kingdom and Ireland following their representation of Slovenia at the Eurovision Song Contest. On 31 May 2023, it was announced that "Carpe Diem" had become the most streamed Slovene language song in streaming history, generating over 10 million streams in the three months following release.
