= Lara-B =

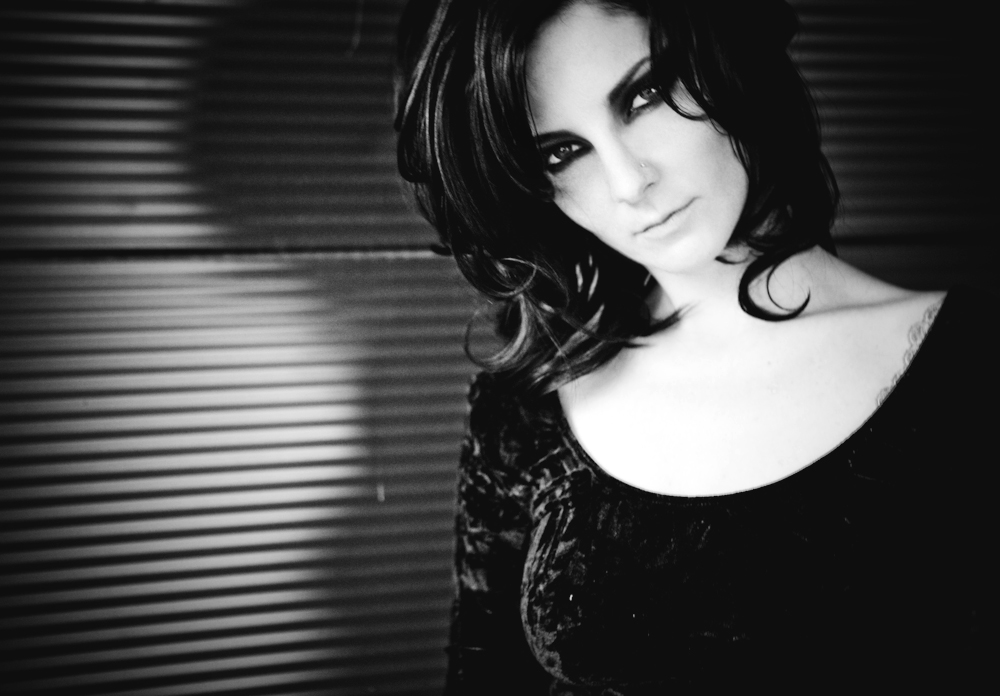
- Lara-B, photo:Mimi Antolović

Background information
- Birth name: Lara Baruca
- Born: August 1, 1979 (age 45) Koper, SFR Yugoslavia
- Genres: Alternative, Electronica
- Occupation(s): Singer, songwriter, musician
- Instrument(s): Vocals, piano, guitar
- Years active: 1997–present
- Labels: Menart Records, Cornucopia Publishing

Lara-B (born Lara Baruca, born August 1, 1979, in Koper, SR Slovenia is a singer who began her career in her early teens. Her musical style combines rock, electronic, industrial and soul.

Baruca began performing in 1992. After performing at various music festivals (MMS '95, Kraška popevka '95, Slovenska popevka '99, EMA '99, MMS '99, Malta Festival '99), she turned her music aspirations mainly to concert stages. She combines her live performances with her studio work, and has created several albums: Hudič izgublja moč in 1997, Kar ne piše in 1999, Beenarni sistem in 2001, Mindhacker in 2005, and X in 2007, which is a compilation consisting mainly of live performances of the previous material, and represents a 10-year anniversary from her debut. She has also written scores for several theatrical performances ("Behind That Curtain" in 2002, "Confi-dance" in 2003, "Glasba in Gib" in 2004 and "Tihe Resnice" in 2005). Her musical expression has been expressed in other genres as well (house, ambient, and drum 'n' bass).

== Mindhacker ==
Lara's first major album release was Mindhacker on Menart Records. Paul Flowers, in his review for WUSC-FM in Columbia, South Carolina, call the album a step forward that shows a continued maturity in singing, composition and a new creative edge. When discussing the album, Baruca jokingly alluded to certain aspects of the album being "emo" in appearance. Mindhacker encompasses a great amount of her personal energies and life experiences, dealing with personal loss and growth emotionally.
