= Joker Out =

Slovenian indie rock band

- Joker Out in 2024, from left to right: Jure Maček, Nace Jordan, Kris Guštin, Jan Peteh; below: Bojan Cvjetićanin.

Background information
- Origin: Ljubljana, Slovenia
- Genres: Indie rock; rock
- Years active: 2016–present
- Members: Bojan Cvjetićanin; Jure Maček; Kris Guštin; Jan Peteh; Nace Jordan
- Past members: Matic Kovačič; Martin Jurkovič
- Website: www.jokeroutband.com

The band's stylised logo.

Joker Out is a Slovenian indie rock band formed in Ljubljana in 2016. They represented Slovenia in the Eurovision Song Contest 2023 with the song "Carpe Diem", placing 21st. Their discography includes three studio albums: Umazane misli (2021), Demoni (2022), and Souvenir Pop (2024).

== Career ==
=== 2016–2021: Formation and Umazane misli ===
The group was formed in May 2016 after the breakup of Apokalipsa, which included Bojan Cvjetićanin, Martin Jurkovič, Matic Kovačič and Luka Škerlep. Three of them (Cvjetićanin, Jurkovič, and Kovačič) were joined by Kris Guštin and Jan Peteh from Buržuazija, and Joker Out was born. In November they released their first single "Kot srce, ki kri poganja", for which they also recorded their first music video. On 17 June 2017 they became the winners of the 4th season (2016/17) of the Špil league (a competition for student musical groups and soloists). In November they released their second song "Omamljeno telo". The group also performed at many festivals.

Their next single "Gola", on which they first collaborated with producer Žare Pak, was released on 12 September 2019. On 2 November they had their first completely independent concert, held at the Ljubljana Castle. "Gola" was followed by the fourth single "Vem da greš" in March 2020, followed by "Umazane misli" (October 2020) and "A sem ti povedal" (July 2021). Jure Maček replaced drummer Matic Kovačič between the releases of "Umazane misli" and "A sem ti povedal". The composition "Umazane misli" was chosen by the audience as the Best New Slovene Song of the Past Year at the first edition of the Frišno/Fresh music festival, which took place on 1 October 2021.

Their first album Umazane misli was released in October 2021. It was originally planned to be released in April 2020, but the release was postponed several times due to the COVID-19 pandemic. It was presented at two consecutive concerts on 20 and 21 October 2021 in Cvetličarna, both of which were sold out in 2020. The second concert was recorded by Radiotelevizija Slovenija (RTV Slovenija). In these two years, they received two Zlata piščal (Golden Flute) awards – the first in 2020 for Newcomers of the Year, and the second in 2021 for Artists of the Year.

=== 2022–2023: Demoni and Eurovision Song Contest ===
In April 2022, they released the music video for the last single from their first album "Barve Oceana". On 12 May, at the eighth edition of the Zlata piščal Awards, they were nominated for "Artist of the Year" for the second year in a row. On 31 August they released their second album Demoni, which was preceded by the song "Katrina". They held a presentation concert for the album on 9 September at the Križanke outdoor theatre in Slovenia's capital Ljubljana. On 10 October they announced on Instagram that bassist Martin Jurkovič was leaving the band to study abroad and was being replaced by Nace Jordan, a member of "Diamanti", the house band of the "V petek zvečer" show. "Katrina" was followed at the end of October by "Demoni", their first Serbian-language single, which represents their first official release for the former Yugoslav market.

On 8 December 2022, RTV Slovenija announced that Joker Out would represent Slovenia in the Eurovision Song Contest 2023 in Liverpool. Recording for their Eurovision song took place within the month of December 2022 in Hamburg, Germany, over a 12-day period. The band stated that they wanted to keep the entire song in the Slovene language, saying: "we want to translate Slovenian into a universal language of dance and entertainment that all countries understand." In January 2023, the band shot their music video in Ljubljana, at the Grand Hotel Union.

On the same day that the band was announced to be internally selected by RTV Slovenija, the broadcaster announced that their song, later revealed to be titled "Carpe Diem", would premiere on a special Eurovision broadcast on TV SLO 1 called Misija Liverpool on 4 February 2023, along with the Eurovision Song Contest premiering the music video on their YouTube channel. On 31 January, Joker Out was drawn to perform in the second half of the second semi-final on 11 May.

As part of the promotional tour, in March and April they took part in the Eurovision pre-parties in Barcelona, Warsaw, Tel Aviv, Madrid, Amsterdam and London, and before leaving for Liverpool, they said goodbye to their home audience with a concert at Ljubljana's Novi trg on 25 April. In March, they were included in the list of 100 noteworthy music performers in Europe (Artists to Watch 2023), by the Association of Independent Music Labels IMPALA. On 21 April they released the single "New Wave" (an English-Slovene version of their song "Novi val"), recorded with Elvis Costello.

At Eurovision, they performed in the second semi-final and qualified for the final, where they finished in 21st place. Following the contest, the band embarked on a European tour across Slovenia, Croatia, Poland, Bosnia and Herzegovina, and Serbia, as well as Ireland and the United Kingdom. In June, they announced a Nordic tour for September, including shows in Norway, Sweden and Finland. They sold out 12,000-capacity arena gig in their hometown, Ljubljana, on 6 October in Arena Stožice.

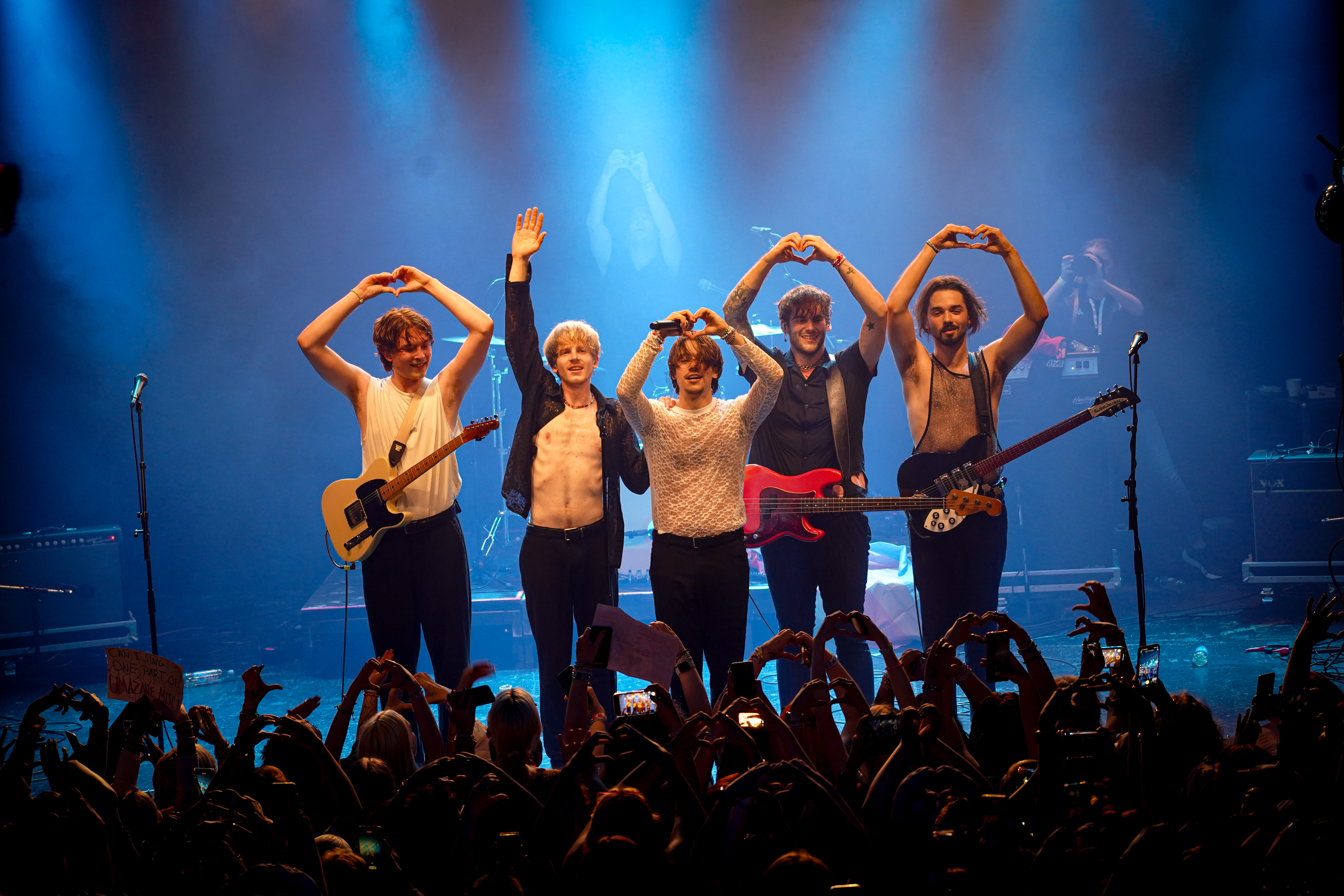
Joker Out thank their fans after finishing a concert in Tavastia, Helsinki in 2023

In July, they went on a sold-out UK Tour alongside Irish band Wild Youth, with concerts in Manchester, Liverpool, Glasgow and London. In the latter, they performed at the Electric Ballroom to a crowd of 1,500, among whom was the famous Scottish singer Lewis Capaldi.

=== 2024-present Souvenir Pop and new single ===
Joker Out has published their third studio album, "Souvenir Pop" in November 2024. In November 2025, they published single "Supersonic", and in December they released the music video for Supersonic. To celebrate their 10th anniversary, the band hosted "Karneval", a big concert which was attended by about 17.000 people at Kardeljeva ploščad, Ljubljana on the 20th of June 2026.

== Band members ==
=== Current members ===
- Bojan Cvjetićanin (born in 6 January 1999) – lead vocals, occasional guitars (2016–present)
- Kris Guštin (born in 16 January 2000) – guitars, backing vocals (2016–present)
- Jan Peteh (born in 1 January 2000) – guitars, piano, synthesizers (2016–present)
- Jure Maček (born in 25 May 1995) – drums, percussion (2021–present)
- Nace Jordan (born in 30 June 1994) – bass guitar, backing vocals, (2022–present)

=== Former members ===
- Martin Jurkovič – bass guitar (2016–2022; guest 2023)
- Matic Kovačič – drums, percussion (2016–2021; guest 2023)

== Discography ==
=== Studio albums ===
List of albums, with selected details
Title	Details	Peak chart positions	
Title	Details	CRO Int.	LTU
Umazane misli	Released: 18 October 2021; Label: Virgin; Formats: CD, LP, digital download, streaming	—	72
Demoni	Released: 31 August 2022; Label: Virgin; Formats: CD, LP, digital download, streaming	—	44
Souvenir Pop	Released: 15 November 2024; Label: Virgin; Formats: Digital download, streaming, CD, LP	32	—
"—" denotes an album that did not chart or was not released in that territory.

=== Live albums ===
List of albums, with selected details
Title	Details
Live from Arena Stožice	Released: 23.12.2023; Label: Shagadelic Records; Formats: LP, streaming

=== Singles ===
List of singles
Title	Year	Peak chart positions				Album or EP
Title	Year	SLO	FIN	LTU	SWE Heat.	Album or EP
"Kot srce, ki kri poganja"	2016	—	—	—	—	Non album single
"Omamljeno telo"	2017	—	—	—	—	Umazane misli
"Gola"	2019	—	—	—	—	Umazane misli
"Vem, da greš"	2020	—	—	—	—	Umazane misli
"Umazane misli"	2020	—	—	—	—	Umazane misli
"A sem ti povedal"	2021	—	—	—	—	Umazane misli
"Barve oceana"	2022	—	—	—	—	Umazane misli
"Katrina"	2022	—	—	—	—	Demoni
"Demoni"	2022	—	—	—	—	Demoni
"Carpe Diem"	2023	1	12	4	4	Souvenir Pop
"New Wave" (with Elvis Costello)	2023	—	—	—	—	Non-album singles
"Sunny Side of London"	2023	—	—	—	—	Non-album singles
"Everybody's Waiting"	2024	—	—	—	—	Souvenir Pop
"Šta Bih Ja"	2024	—	—	—	—	Souvenir Pop
"Bluza"	2024	—	—	—	—	Souvenir Pop
"Stephanie"	2024	—	—	—	—	Souvenir Pop
"Supersonic"	2025	—	—	—	—	Non-album singles
"Odsevi sonca"	2026	—	—	—	—	Non-album singles

== Awards and nominations ==
Awards and nominations for Joker Out
Award	Year	Category	Nominated work	Result
Zlata piščal (The Golden Whistle)	2020	Song of the Year	"Gola"	Nomination
Zlata piščal (The Golden Whistle)	2020	Newcomer of the Year	Joker Out	Won
Zlata piščal (The Golden Whistle)	2021	Artist of the Year	Joker Out	Won
Zlata piščal (The Golden Whistle)	2022	Artist of the Year	Joker Out	Won
Zlata piščal (The Golden Whistle)	2022	Song of the Year	"Umazane misli"	Nomination
Zlata piščal (The Golden Whistle)	2022	Song of the Year	"A sem ti povedal"	Nomination
Zlata piščal (The Golden Whistle)	2022	Album of the Year	Umazane misli	Nomination
Zlata piščal (The Golden Whistle)	2023	Artist of the Year	Joker Out	Nomination
Zlata piščal (The Golden Whistle)	2023	Album of the Year	Demoni	Nomination
MAC (Music Awards Ceremony)	2023	Rock Song	"Barve oceana"	Nomination
Zlata piščal (The Golden Whistle)	2024	Song of the Year	"Carpe Diem"	Nomination
Zlata piščal (The Golden Whistle)	2024	Artist of the Year	Joker Out	Won

Awards and achievements
Preceded by LPS with "Disko"	Slovenia in the Eurovision Song Contest; 2023	Succeeded by Raiven with "Veronika"
