= Carpe Diem (Joker Out song) =

2023 song by Joker Out

Single by Joker Out

from the album Souvenir Pop
- Language: Slovene
- Released: 4 February 2023
- Recorded: December 2022
- Length: 2:45
- Label: Self-released
- Songwriters: Bojan Cvjetićanin; Jan Peteh; Jure Maček; Kris Guštin; Nace Jordan; Žarko Pak

Joker Out singles chronology
| "Katrina" (2022) | "Carpe Diem" (2023) |

Music video
- "Carpe Diem" on YouTube

Eurovision Song Contest 2023 entry
- Country: Slovenia
- Artist: Joker Out
- Composers: Bojan Cvjetićanin; Jan Peteh; Jure Maček; Kris Guštin; Nace Jordan; Žarko Pak
- Lyricist: Bojan Cvjetićanin

Finals performance
- Semi-final result: 5th
- Semi-final points: 103
- Final result: 21st
- Final points: 78

Entry chronology
- ◄ "Disko" (2022)
- "Veronika" (2024) ►

Official performance video
- "Carpe Diem" (semi-final 2) on YouTube "Carpe Diem" (final) on YouTube

"Carpe Diem" (Classical Latin: [ˈkarpɛ ˈdi.ẽː], Ecclesiastical Latin: [ˈkarpe ˈdi.em]; transl. Seize the day) is a song by Slovene pop rock band Joker Out, released on 4 February 2023. The song represented Slovenia in the Eurovision Song Contest 2023, after the band was internally selected on 8 December 2022 by Radiotelevizija Slovenija (RTV Slovenija), Slovenia's broadcaster for the Eurovision Song Contest. The song finished in fifth place in the second semi-final and qualified for the final, where it finished in 21st place with 78 points. The song peaked at number one in Slovenia and reached the top ten in Latvia, Lithuania and Sweden.

== Production and release ==
Recording for the song took place within the month of December 2022 in a Hamburg, Germany studio over a 12-day period, according to an Instagram post that the band had posted. The band has stated that they had wanted to keep the entire song in the Slovene language, saying that "we want to translate Slovenian into a universal language of dance and entertainment that all countries understand." In January 2023, the band filmed their music video, shot in Slovenia's capital, Ljubljana, at the Grand Hotel Union.

On the same day that the band was announced as having been internally selected by Radiotelevizija Slovenija (RTV Slovenija), the broadcaster announced that the song would premiere on a special Eurovision broadcast on TV SLO 1 called Misija Liverpool on 4 February 2023, along with the Eurovision Song Contest premiering the music video on their YouTube channel.

== Eurovision Song Contest ==
=== At Eurovision ===
According to Eurovision rules, all nations with the exceptions of the host country and the "Big Five" (France, Germany, Italy, Spain and the United Kingdom) are required to qualify from one of two semi-finals in order to compete for the final; the top ten countries from each semi-final progress to the final. The European Broadcasting Union (EBU) split up the competing countries into six different pots based on voting patterns from previous contests, with countries with favourable voting histories put into the same pot. On 31 January 2023, an allocation draw was held which placed each country into one of the two semi-finals, as well as which half of the show they would perform in. Slovenia was placed into the second semi-final, held on 11 May 2023, and was scheduled to perform in the second half of the show.

== Charts and certifications ==
Chart performance for "Carpe Diem"
| Chart (2023) | Peak position |
|---|---|
| Croatia (Billboard) | 14 |
| Finland (Suomen virallinen lista) | 12 |
| Greece International (IFPI) | 68 |
| Iceland (Tónlistinn) | 31 |
| Latvia (LAIPA) | 10 |
| Lithuania (AGATA) | 4 |
| Netherlands (Single Tip) | 15 |
| Poland (Polish Streaming Top 100) | 40 |
| Slovenia (Radiomonitor) | 1 |
| Sweden Heatseeker (Sverigetopplistan) | 4 |
