= Ljubljana Slovene National Theatre Opera and Ballet =

National opera and ballet company of Slovenia

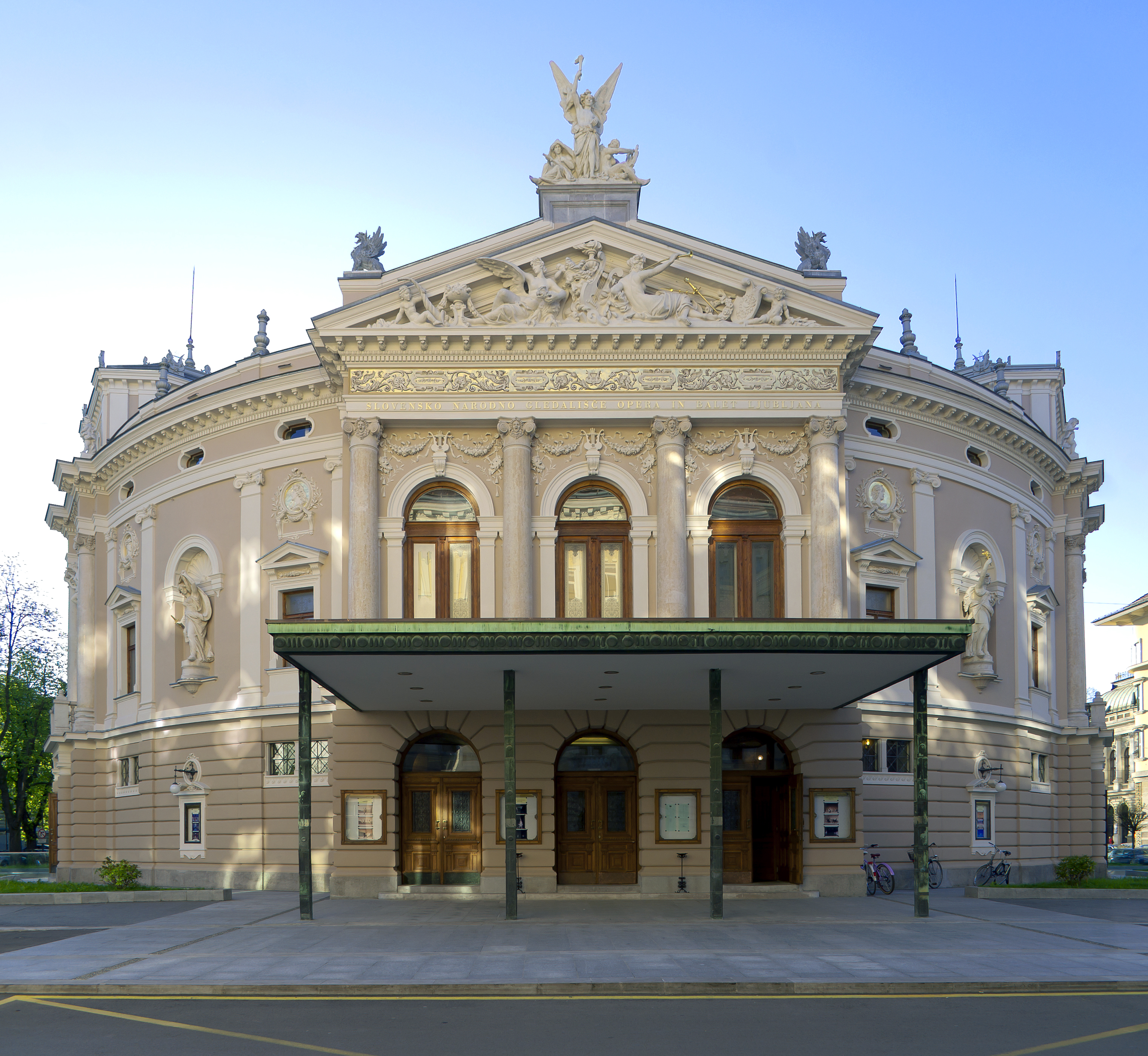
Ljubljana Opera House, built in 1892, seat of the Ljubljana Opera and Ballet Slovene National Theatre

The Ljubljana Slovene National Theatre Opera and Ballet (Slovene: Slovensko narodno gledališče Opera in balet Ljubljana, SNG Opera in balet Ljubljana), or shortly Ljubljana SNG Opera and Ballet, is Slovenia's national opera and ballet company. Its seat is the Ljubljana Opera House at 1 Župančič Street (Župančičeva cesta 1) in Ljubljana. The Ljubljana Slovene National Theatre Opera and Ballet was founded in 1918. It is now a subsection of the Slovene National Drama Theatre in Ljubljana (Slovensko narodno gledališče and has about 50 dancers. Since 2013, its director has been the lawyer Peter Sotošek Štular, and its artistic director the opera stage director Rocc (Rok Rappl).

Both SNG and SNT are used. (One is the initials of the name in English; the other is the Slovene initials.)

== History ==
The history of opera in Slovenia goes back to Giuseppe Clemente de Bonomi's Il Tamerlano in 1732. Operas were at first staged in the Provincial Theatre Building at Congress Square, at the site of today's National Philharmonics Building. The Ljubljana Opera House was built in 1892. The Provincial Theatre (Deželno gledališče, the predecessor of the Ljubljana SNG Opera and Ballet, until 1911 shared premises with the German Theatre (German: Deutsches Theater), which then moved to the Ljubljana Drama Theatre.

In 1918, the company was enlarged with its own orchestra and a professional ballet group. The conductor Mirko Polič performed Western repertoire as well as Slavic works such as the ballets of the Bulgarian composer Pancho Vladigerov and works of the Slovene composer Marij Kogoj. The current repertoire includes Massenet, Rossini, Mozart, etc.

== See also ==
- Maribor Slovene National Theatre (SNG Maribor)
- Nova Gorica Slovene National Theatre (SNG Nova Gorica)
- Ljubljana City Theatre (Mestno gledališče ljubljansko, MGL)
- Slovenian Philharmonic
- Cankar Hall, Ljubljana, 10 Prešeren Street
- Križanke Summer Theatre, Ljubljana, 28 Miklosich Street
- Ljubljana Castle, Estate Hall concerts
