= Slovenia in the Eurovision Song Contest 2025 =

- Eurovision Song Contest 2025
- Participating broadcaster: Radiotelevizija Slovenija (RTVSLO)
- Country: Slovenia
- Selection process: Evrovizijska Melodija 2025
- Selection date: 1 February 2025

Competing entry
- Song: "How Much Time Do We Have Left"
- Artist: Klemen
- Songwriter: Klemen Slakonja

Placement
- Semi-final result: Failed to qualify (13th)

Participation chronology

Slovenia was represented at the Eurovision Song Contest 2025 with the song "How Much Time Do We Have Left", written and performed by Klemen Slakonja. The Slovenian participating broadcaster, Radiotelevizija Slovenija (RTVSLO), organised the national final EMA 2025 in order to select its entry for the contest.

Slovenia was drawn to compete in the first semi-final of the Eurovision Song Contest which took place on 13 May 2025. Performing during the show in position 3, "How Much Time Do We Have Left" was not announced among the top 10 entries of the first semi-final and therefore did not qualify to compete in the final. It was later revealed that Slovenia placed thirteenth out of the 15 participating countries in the semi-final with 23 points.

As of 2026, this was the final Slovene entry at the contest, before the country opted out of participating the following year.

== Background ==
Prior to the 2025 contest, Radiotelevizija Slovenija (RTVSLO) had participated in the Eurovision Song Contest representing Slovenia twenty-nine times since its first entry in 1993. Its highest placing in the contest, to this point, has been seventh place, achieved on two occasions: in 1995 with the song "Prisluhni mi" performed by Darja Švajger and in 2001 with the song "Energy" performed by Nuša Derenda. Its only other top ten result was achieved in 1997 when Tanja Ribič performing "Zbudi se" placed tenth. Since the introduction of semi-finals to the format of the contest in 2004, Slovenia has thus far managed to qualify to the final on eight occasions, the latest being in 2024, when "Veronika" performed by Raiven ultimately placed 23rd in the final.

As part of its duties as participating broadcaster, RTVSLO organises the selection of its entry in the Eurovision Song Contest and broadcasts the event in the country. The broadcaster had usually selected its entry through a national final entitled Evrovizijska Melodija (EMA), which has been produced with variable formats, with the exceptions of 2013, 2021, 2023, and 2024, when the entries were internally selected. On 12 September 2024, RTVSLO announced that it would not take a decision on participation in the 2025 contest until October 2024, having been granted an extension by the EBU. However, on 16 September 2024, RTVSLO confirmed its intention to participate in the 2025 contest; plans regarding the selection were announced on 28 October 2024, with EMA returning as the national final format.

== Before Eurovision ==
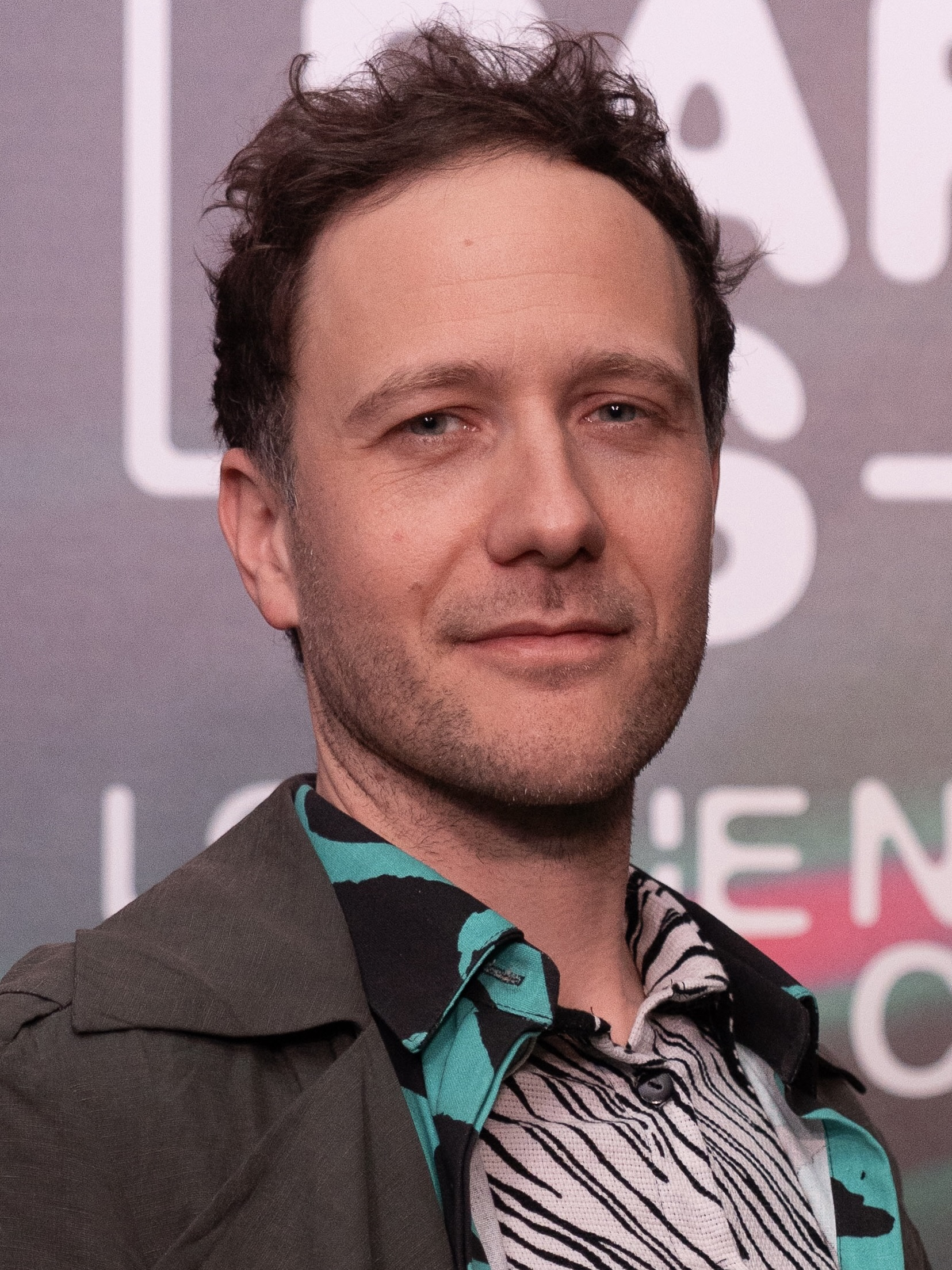
Klemen, winner of EMA 2025, at the PrePartyES event in Madrid

=== EMA 2025 ===
EMA 2025 was the twenty-fifth edition of EMA, the format used by RTVSLO to select its entry for the Eurovision Song Contest. The competition took place on 1 February 2025 at the RTVSLO Studio 1 in Ljubljana, hosted by Gregor Štrasbergar and Raiven, the latter of whom represented Slovenia in 2024. The show was broadcast on TV SLO 1, Radio Val 202, and Radio Maribor, as well as online via the streaming platform RTV 4D. The show was watched by an average of 206,500 viewers, equating to an average viewing share of 24%. 514,000 viewers watched for at least one minute, with a peak of 267,900 viewers. This marked a reduction of 28,300 viewers since the previous edition in 2022.

==== Competing entries ====
A submission period for interested artists and composers was open between 29 October and 25 November 2024. In order to qualify to compete, the main performer of an entry was required to hold temporary or permanent residence in Slovenia. RTVSLO also directly invited artists and composers from the national music scene. At the closing of the window, 114 entries had been submitted. An expert committee consisting of 2018 and 2022 Slovenian representatives Lea Sirk and Filip Vidušin (the latter as part of the group LPS), as well as singer Alenka Godec, Radio Val 202 editor Neja Jerant and composer Martin Bezjak selected twelve contestants, which were announced on 13 December 2024.

The entries were presented to the public in an introduction show, entitled Ema pred Emo ("EMA before EMA"), on 25 January 2025, hosted by Bernarda Žarn and Jože Robežnik, and broadcast on TV SLO 1. The introduction show included guest appearances from Miša Molk and Denis Živčec as well as multiple past Slovenian entrants: Josip-Cole Moretti (1993 as part of 1X Band), Nuša Derenda (2001), Omar Naber (2005 and 2017), Maja Keuc (2011), Eva Boto (2012) and Lea Sirk. Each entry was presented during the show with a thirty-second clip, and all 12 entries were later released in full on RTVSLO's RTV 360 online platform.

| Artist | Song | Language | Songwriter(s) |
|---|---|---|---|
| Anna | "Čau" | Slovene | Krešimir Tomec; Špela Tomec |
| Astrid and the Scandals | "Touché" | English | Astrid Ana Kljun; Luka Flegar; Tomaž Zupančič |
| Eva Pavli | "Niti" | Slovene | Eva Pavli; Hugo Smeh |
| Jon Vitezič | "Vse ti dam" | Slovene | Jon Vitezič; Peter Dekleva |
| July Jones | "New Religion" | English | Bardo; Gracey; July Jones; Kiris Houston; Neave Applebaum |
| Kiki | "O-ou!" | Slovene | Blaž Mikl; Jovica Novkovič; Laetitia "Kiki" Pohl |
| Klemen | "How Much Time Do We Have Left" | English | Klemen Slakonja |
| PolarAce | "Kind" | English | Aleksej Ivačič Kolar; Peter Penko |
| Rai | "Frederick's Dead" | English | Lara Gregorčič; Vanja Rok Vrtovec |
| Trine | "Grace" | English | Jernej Kržič; Trine Slabe |
| Žan Videc | "Pusti da gori" | Slovene | Goran Sarjaš; Žan Videc |
| Zven | "Divja" | Slovene | Luka Jamnik; Zvezdana Novakovič |

==== Final ====
The final took place on 1 February 2025 at 20:00 CET. The winner, "How Much Time Do We Have Left" performed by Klemen, was determined over two rounds of voting. In the first round, five thematic jury panels, each composed of five members, each distributed their points following the same pattern used in the Eurovision Song Contest, i.e. 1–8, 10 and 12 points and selected two entries to proceed to the second round; these panels consisted of music performers, songwriters and producers, radio and television personalities, members of OGAE Slovenia, and international Eurovision influencers and journalists. In the superfinal, televoting exclusively determined the winner.

In addition to the competing entries, guests included Urban Koritnik, lead singer of Jet Black Diamonds, and past Slovenian Eurovision entrants Josip-Cole Moretti, Darja Švajger, Nuša Derenda, Maja Keuc, Lea Sirk, Ana Soklič, Bojan Cvjetićanin, and Filip Vidušin. Soklič, who previously represented Slovenia in 2021, performed Magnifico's "Silvija". Vidušin, Koritnik and Sirk performed 1X Band's "Tih deževen dan", which represented Slovenia in 1993. Raiven also performed her new single "Hedonista", and Gregor Štrasbergar, as a member of Mrfy, performed "Helo". The two hosts also performed a medley of their respective hits.

Final – 1 February 2025
| R/O | Artist | Song | Points | Place |
|---|---|---|---|---|
| 1 | Anna | "Čau" | 15 | 9 |
| 2 | Zven | "Divja" | 21 | 5 |
| 3 | PolarAce | "Kind" | 15 | 10 |
| 4 | Astrid and the Scandals | "Touché" | 32 | 3 |
| 5 | Jon Vitezič | "Vse ti dam" | 20 | 7 |
| 6 | Kiki | "O-ou!" | 31 | 4 |
| 7 | Eva Pavli | "Niti" | 18 | 8 |
| 8 | Klemen | "How Much Time Do We Have Left" | 51 | 1 |
| 9 | July Jones | "New Religion" | 50 | 2 |
| 10 | Žan Videc | "Pusti da gori" | 8 | 11 |
| 11 | Trine | "Grace" | 8 | 12 |
| 12 | Rai | "Frederick's Dead" | 21 | 6 |

Superfinal – 1 February 2025
| R/O | Artist | Song | Televote | Place |
|---|---|---|---|---|
| 1 | Klemen | "How Much Time Do We Have Left" | 8,895 | 1 |
| 2 | July Jones | "New Religion" | 4,400 | 2 |

Detailed jury votes
| R/O | Song | Fans | Performers | Television | Radio | Influencers | Total |
|---|---|---|---|---|---|---|---|
| 1 | "Čau" | 6 | 2 | 7 | | | 15 |
| 2 | "Divja" | 8 | 1 | 2 | 4 | 6 | 21 |
| 3 | "Kind" | 2 | | 6 | 7 | | 15 |
| 4 | "Touché" | 10 | 10 | 3 | 6 | 3 | 32 |
| 5 | "Vse ti dam" | 4 | | 4 | 2 | 10 | 20 |
| 6 | "O-ou!" | 1 | 7 | 10 | 8 | 5 | 31 |
| 7 | "Niti" | 5 | 5 | 1 | | 7 | 18 |
| 8 | "How Much Time Do We Have Left" | 7 | 12 | 12 | 12 | 8 | 51 |
| 9 | "New Religion" | 12 | 8 | 8 | 10 | 12 | 50 |
| 10 | "Pusti da gori" | | 4 | | 3 | 1 | 8 |
| 11 | "Grace" | | 3 | | 1 | 4 | 8 |
| 12 | "Frederick's Dead" | 3 | 6 | 5 | 5 | 2 | 21 |

Jury members
| Jury | Members |
|---|---|
| Members of OGAE Slovenia | Jan Vehar (spokesperson); Metka Dolanc; Rene Dopler; David Sopotnik; Boštjan Smrekar |
| Producers, performers, songwriters | Gregor Ravnik (spokesperson); Kris Guštin; Rok Lunaček; Karin Zemljič; Neža Buh |
| Television personalities | Leila Aleksandra Jelić (spokesperson); Dajana Makovec; Juš Hrastnik; Rok Smolej; Anže Škrube |
| Radio personalities | Melani Mekicar (spokesperson); Jernej Sobočan; Gregor Stermecki; Urša Mravlje; Jana Morelj |
| International Eurovision influencers | William Lee Adams (spokesperson); Adam Mc Callig; Sanja Daić; Alesia Michelle; Jan Bors |

=== Calls for exclusion of Israel ===
Israel's continuing participation in the contest was one of the topics discussed by the management board of RTVSLO in December 2024, in light of the controversies relating to the country's participation in the 2024 edition amidst the Gaza war. The board voted to initiate a request within the European Broadcasting Union for Israel not to compete in 2025, and to keep the Slovenian public informed about these efforts. Similar to the previous year, several Slovenian politicians, musicians, and cultural figures called for Israel's exclusion.

== At Eurovision ==
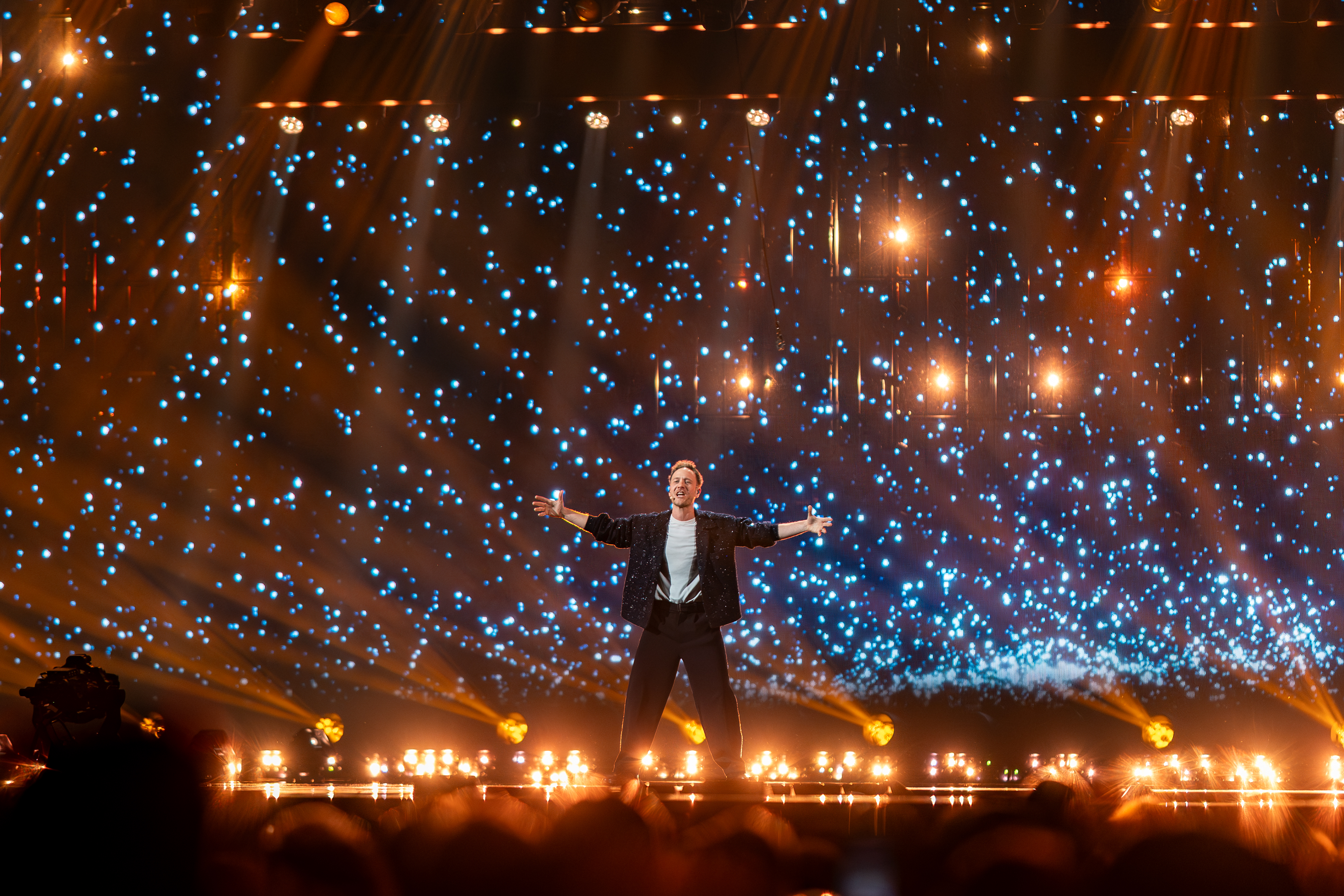
Klemen during the first semi-final on 13 May 2025.

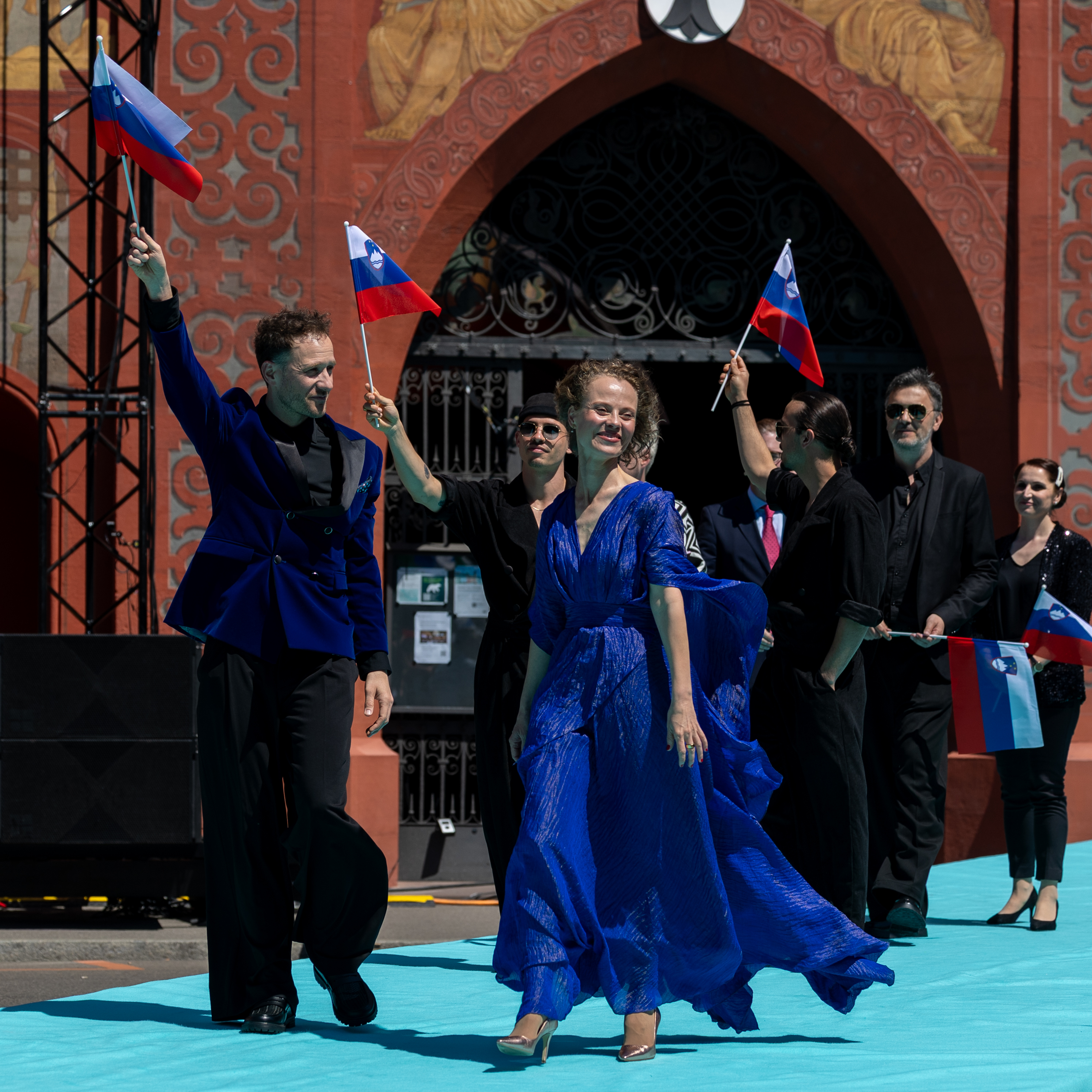
Klemen and the Slovenian delegation during the opening ceremony.

The Eurovision Song Contest 2025 took place at the St. Jakobshalle in Basel, Switzerland, and consisted of two semi-finals held on the respective dates of 13 and 15 May and the final on 17 May 2025. All nations with the exceptions of the host country and the "Big Five" (France, Germany, Italy, Spain and the United Kingdom) were required to qualify from one of two semi-finals in order to compete in the final; the top ten countries from each semi-final progressed to the final. On 28 January 2025, an allocation draw was held to determine which of the two semi-finals, as well as which half of the show, each country would perform in; the EBU split up the competing countries into different pots based on voting patterns from previous contests, with countries with favourable voting histories put into the same pot. Slovenia was scheduled for the first half of the first semi-final. The shows' producers then decided the running order for the semi-finals; Slovenia was set to perform in position 3.

In Slovenia, RTVSLO broadcast the semi-finals on TV SLO 2 and the final on TV SLO 1, all with live commentary from Ljubljana by Mojca Mavec, as well as the first semi-final and the final on Radio Val 202 with commentary by Maj Valerij, who was joined by Igor Bračič for the final. An average of 144,700 viewers were recorded for the first semi-final on TV SLO 2, equating a viewing share of 7.5%. The second semi-final, also broadcast on TV SLO 2, saw 49,700 viewers (2.6% share). For the show's live broadcast on TV SLO 1, the final was watched by an average audience of 150,400 viewers, with a share of 7.8%. This marked a reduction of 45% from the 2024 contest. The audience peaked at 260,100 viewers for Klemen's performance of “How Much Time Do We Have Left”, and 742,300 viewers watched at least one minute of the contest.

=== Performance ===
Klemen took part in technical rehearsals on 3 and 7 May, followed by dress rehearsals on 12 and 13 May. On 2 May 2025, he revealed that the performance would include a stunt of himself being suspended upside-down, retaining the climax of the national final. Klemen was joined on stage by his wife, Mojca Fatur, and dancers Miha Furlan and Matic Zadravec. The director for the performance was Nejc Levstik, the lighting was directed by Črt Birsa, the content designer for the LED screens was Žiga Radulj, the technical execution of the acrobatics was led by Filip Kržišnik, the choreographer was Erik Bukovnik, and the costume designer was Vesna Mirtelj.

=== Semi-final ===
Slovenia performed in position 3, following the entry from Poland and before the entry from Estonia. At the end of the show, the country was not announced as a qualifier for the final, marking the first time since 2022 that Slovenia failed to qualify for the final. It was later revealed that Slovenia placed thirteenth out of the fifteen participating countries in the first semi-final with 23 points.

=== Voting ===
Below is a breakdown of points awarded by and to Slovenia in the first semi-final and in the final. Voting during the three shows involved each country awarding sets of points from 1-8, 10 and 12: one from their professional jury and the other from televoting in the final vote, while the semi-final vote was based entirely on the vote of the public. The Slovenian jury consisted of Gregor Strasbergar, Jon Vitezič, Urban Koritnik, Ana Soklič, who represented Slovenia in 2021, and Eva Boto, who represented Slovenia in 2012. In the first semi-final, Slovenia placed 13th with 23 points, which marked the country's first non-qualification to the final since 2022. Over the course of the contest, Slovenia awarded its 12 points to Croatia in the first semi-final, and to Italy in both the jury vote and televote in the final.

RTVSLO appointed Lorella Flego as its spokesperson to announce the Slovenian jury's votes in the final.

==== Points awarded to Slovenia ====
Points awarded to Slovenia (Semi-final 1)
| Score | Televote |
|---|---|
| 12 points | |
| 10 points | |
| 8 points | San Marino (Note: San Marino uses a jury in the semi-finals.) |
| 7 points | |
| 6 points | Croatia |
| 5 points | |
| 4 points | |
| 3 points | Estonia |
| 2 points | Azerbaijan |
| 1 point | Albania; Cyprus; Norway; Ukraine |

==== Points awarded by Slovenia ====
Points awarded by Slovenia (Semi-final 1)
| Score | Televote |
|---|---|
| 12 points | Croatia |
| 10 points | Cyprus |
| 8 points | Ukraine |
| 7 points | Albania |
| 6 points | Netherlands |
| 5 points | Iceland |
| 4 points | Sweden |
| 3 points | Portugal |
| 2 points | Norway |
| 1 point | Estonia |

Points awarded by Slovenia (Final)
| Score | Televote | Jury |
|---|---|---|
| 12 points | Italy | Italy |
| 10 points | Austria | Austria |
| 8 points | Albania | Switzerland |
| 7 points | Estonia | Estonia |
| 6 points | Israel | Sweden |
| 5 points | Sweden | Ukraine |
| 4 points | Luxembourg | Netherlands |
| 3 points | Ukraine | France |
| 2 points | Norway | Norway |
| 1 point | Iceland | Portugal |

==== Detailed voting results ====
Each participating broadcaster assembles a five-member jury panel consisting of music industry professionals who are citizens of the country they represent. Each jury, and individual jury member, is required to meet a strict set of criteria regarding professional background, as well as diversity in gender and age. No member of a national jury was permitted to be related in any way to any of the competing acts in such a way that they cannot vote impartially and independently. The individual rankings of each jury member as well as the nation's televoting results were released shortly after the grand final.

The following members comprised the Slovenian jury:

- Gregor Strasbergar – singer-songwriter, guitarist
- Jon Vitezič – singer
- Urban Koritnik – musician
- Ana Soklič – singer-songwriter, represented Slovenia in 2021
- Eva Boto – singer, broadcaster, represented Slovenia in 2012

Detailed voting results from Slovenia (Semi-final 1)
| R/O | Country | Televote | |
| R/O | Country | Rank | Points |
|---|---|---|---|
| 01 | Iceland | 6 | 5 |
| 02 | Poland | 12 | |
| 03 | Slovenia | | |
| 04 | Estonia | 10 | 1 |
| 05 | Ukraine | 3 | 8 |
| 06 | Sweden | 7 | 4 |
| 07 | Portugal | 8 | 3 |
| 08 | Norway | 9 | 2 |
| 09 | Belgium | 13 | |
| 10 | Azerbaijan | 14 | |
| 11 | San Marino | 11 | |
| 12 | Albania | 4 | 7 |
| 13 | Netherlands | 5 | 6 |
| 14 | Croatia | 1 | 12 |
| 15 | Cyprus | 2 | 10 |

Detailed voting results from Slovenia (Final)
| R/O | Country | Jury | | | | | | | Televote | |
| R/O | Country | Juror A | Juror B | Juror C | Juror D | Juror E | Rank | Points | Rank | Points |
|---|---|---|---|---|---|---|---|---|---|---|
| 01 | Norway | 14 | 14 | 14 | 10 | 4 | 9 | 2 | 9 | 2 |
| 02 | Luxembourg | 23 | 17 | 23 | 25 | 18 | 25 | | 7 | 4 |
| 03 | Estonia | 5 | 11 | 4 | 4 | 5 | 4 | 7 | 4 | 7 |
| 04 | Israel | 9 | 9 | 18 | 22 | 10 | 12 | | 5 | 6 |
| 05 | Lithuania | 26 | 10 | 5 | 23 | 21 | 11 | | 14 | |
| 06 | Spain | 16 | 23 | 20 | 18 | 16 | 24 | | 21 | |
| 07 | Ukraine | 10 | 3 | 3 | 9 | 20 | 6 | 5 | 8 | 3 |
| 08 | United Kingdom | 11 | 18 | 22 | 16 | 17 | 21 | | 24 | |
| 09 | Austria | 1 | 1 | 6 | 5 | 2 | 2 | 10 | 2 | 10 |
| 10 | Iceland | 18 | 22 | 21 | 14 | 7 | 18 | | 10 | 1 |
| 11 | Latvia | 19 | 15 | 11 | 19 | 8 | 16 | | 19 | |
| 12 | Netherlands | 3 | 12 | 9 | 6 | 9 | 7 | 4 | 13 | |
| 13 | Finland | 24 | 26 | 8 | 7 | 25 | 15 | | 11 | |
| 14 | Italy | 4 | 2 | 1 | 1 | 1 | 1 | 12 | 1 | 12 |
| 15 | Poland | 12 | 21 | 15 | 11 | 22 | 20 | | 16 | |
| 16 | Germany | 17 | 19 | 10 | 8 | 26 | 17 | | 12 | |
| 17 | Greece | 15 | 7 | 16 | 12 | 14 | 14 | | 17 | |
| 18 | Armenia | 13 | 25 | 13 | 15 | 13 | 19 | | 25 | |
| 19 | Switzerland | 7 | 6 | 2 | 3 | 3 | 3 | 8 | 20 | |
| 20 | Malta | 20 | 16 | 24 | 13 | 24 | 22 | | 23 | |
| 21 | Portugal | 21 | 4 | 17 | 20 | 15 | 10 | 1 | 18 | |
| 22 | Denmark | 22 | 13 | 19 | 21 | 19 | 23 | | 26 | |
| 23 | Sweden | 2 | 20 | 12 | 2 | 11 | 5 | 6 | 6 | 5 |
| 24 | France | 6 | 5 | 7 | 17 | 6 | 8 | 3 | 15 | |
| 25 | San Marino | 25 | 24 | 26 | 26 | 23 | 26 | | 22 | |
| 26 | Albania | 8 | 8 | 25 | 24 | 12 | 13 | | 3 | 8 |
