= Slovenia in the Eurovision Song Contest 2022 =

- Eurovision Song Contest 2022
- Participating broadcaster: Radiotelevizija Slovenija (RTVSLO)
- Country: Slovenia
- Selection process: Evrovizijska Melodija 2022
- Selection date: 19 February 2022

Competing entry
- Song: "Disko"
- Artist: LPS
- Songwriters: Filip Vidušin; Žiga Žvižej; Gašper Hlupič; Mark Semeja; Zala Velenšek; Jakob Korošec

Placement
- Semi-final result: Failed to qualify (17th)

Participation chronology

Slovenia was represented at the Eurovision Song Contest 2022 with the song "Disko", written and performed by group LPS. The Slovene participating broadcaster, Radiotelevizija Slovenija (RTVSLO), organised the national final Evrovizijska Melodija 2022 in order to select its entry for the contest. The first stage EMA Freš began on 29 November 2021 with the purpose of selecting four newcomer artists to advance to the second stage EMA 2022. The national final featured twenty entries competing across two semi-finals on 5 and 12 February 2022, and the final on 19 February 2022, where a combination of jury and public voting decided the Slovenian representative in Turin among twelve entries.

Slovenia was drawn to compete in the first semi-final of the Eurovision Song Contest which took place on 10 May 2022. Performing during the show in position 5, "Disko" was not announced among the top 10 entries of the first semi-final and therefore did not qualify to compete in the final. It was later revealed that Slovenia placed last out of the 17 participating countries in the semi-final with just 15 points.

== Background ==
Prior to the 2022 contest, Radiotelevizija Slovenija (RTVSLO) had participated in the Eurovision Song Contest representing Slovenia twenty-six times since its first entry in 1993. Its highest placing in the contest, to this point, has been seventh place, achieved on two occasions: in 1995 with the song "Prisluhni mi" performed by Darja Švajger and in 2001 with the song "Energy" performed by Nuša Derenda. The country's only other top ten result was achieved in 1997 when Tanja Ribič performing "Zbudi se" placed tenth. Since the introduction of semi-finals to the format of the contest in 2004, Slovenia had thus far only managed to qualify to the final on six occasions. In 2021, Slovenia was represented by Ana Soklič with the song "Amen", which failed to qualify for the final, finishing in 13th place in the first semi-final with 44 points.

As part of its duties as participating broadcaster, RTVSLO organises the selection of its entry in the Eurovision Song Contest and broadcasts the event in the country. The broadcaster confirmed its participation in the 2022 contest on 15 September 2021. RTVSLO has traditionally selected its entry through a national final entitled Evrovizijska Melodija (EMA), which has been produced with variable formats. To this point, the broadcaster has only foregone the use of the national final twice; in 2013 and in 2021 when the entry was internally selected.

== Before Eurovision ==
=== EMA Freš 2022 ===
EMA Freš returned as the first phase for Slovenia's selection for the Eurovision Song Contest for the second time after its first appearance in 2020, with a revamped format from the first edition. Newcomer artists who were not more than 30 years old and had released a maximum of three songs were eligible to apply for EMA Freš via a submission period opened by RTVSLO on 8 October 2021. A total of 24 artists were selected to take part in the selection, which commenced on 29 November 2021. After a series of nights, each showcasing a duel, 14 entries advanced to take part in the televised final on 28 January 2022. The remaining fourteen entries competed for four places in EMA 2022, two selected by public voting and two selected by a jury.

==== Format ====
Twenty-four songs competed in a series of duels starting in November 2021 for four weeks. After the duels, the fourteen winning songs competed in a televised live final selection show, which took place on 28 January 2022. The selection show saw the remaining fourteen songs compete for four places in the emerging category of EMA 2022.

After the four duels held each week (on Monday, Tuesday, Wednesday and Thursday), a weekly final was held on each Saturday where three out of the four weekly winners advanced: one selected via a public online vote and the other two by a committee composed of Joker Out singer Bojan Cvjetićanin, singer Eva Boto, who represented Slovenia in the Eurovision Song Contest 2012, and rapper Arne Međedović. Non-qualifiers were given a Second Chance on the following week (20 to 24 December), when one more act was chosen among three every day, for a total of fourteen finalists.

On 28 December 2021, Radiotelevizija Slovenija revealed that over 48,000 votes were cast during the online voting rounds of EMA Freš between 29 November and 24 December. The full results were revealed after EMA 2022 on 20 February 2022.

The 14 remaining entries were then originally meant to compete in two final selection shows, in which two entries would qualify from each show. However, on 12 January 2022, it was revealed by RTVSLO that all 14 entries would compete in one show on 28 January 2022 due to programming issues and the effects of the COVID-19 pandemic in Slovenia at the time. The final saw four songs qualify for EMA 2022, with two songs chosen by the public and two by the jury.

==== Competing entries ====
Artists and composers were able to submit their entries to the broadcaster between 8 October 2021 and 22 November 2021. All artists were required to be under the age of 30 and have three commercially released songs or fewer. Two days after the closing of the submission window, RTVSLO announced a total of 127 applications had been received for both competitions. The competing artists for EMA Freš were announced on 26 November 2021, along with which songs would compete in each duel. Among the competing composers was Josip-Cole Moretti, who represented Slovenia in the Eurovision Song Contest 1993 as member of the 1X Band, and Raay, who represented Slovenia in the Eurovision Song Contest 2015 as member of Maraaya.

Artist	Song	Songwriter(s)
Ain't Harmony	"Hočem da"	Anja Ruperčič, Katarina Pangeršič, Nika Svetlin, Nina Pintar, Špela Ivančič
Anja Vodošek	"Maniac"	Raay, Anej Piletič
De Liri	"Obstajam"	Zala Kores, Julija Veleski, Žan Serčič
Ella	"A sem dovolj?"	Špela Škofič, Josip-Cole Moretti, Miklavž Ašič, Jože Andrejaš, Dare Kaurič, Janez Rupnik, Aleš Berkopec, Primož Velikonja, Damjan Berkopec, Mitja Šedlbauer, Nejc Viher
Emma	"Moja sreča"	Neisha, Dejan Radičević
Evita	"Črno-bela"	Eva Šolinc, Marino Legovič, Damjana Kenda-Hussu, Simon Gomilšek, Diana Lečnik, Leon Oblak
Hvala Brothers	"Gremo naprej"	Miha Hvala, Nejc Hvala, Rok Hvala
Ina	"Moj dopamin"	Matic Mlakar, Jure Skaza, Ina Olup
Jaka Hliš	"Svoje sreče krojač"	Jaka Hliš, Alex Volasko
Jon Vitezič	"Jesus Style"	Jon Vitezič, Peter Dekleva
Katja Korošec	"Levo in desno"	Katja Korošec, Nino Oslak
Katja Kos	"Deadly Flower"	Katja Kos, Mario Babojelić
Lara Dovier	"Ko sva se prvič spoznala"	Andrej Bezjak, Marko Duplišak, Lara Dovier, Jure Grudnik, Miha Oblišar, Jean Markič, Marko Golubović, Samuel Waermö, Uroš Obranovič
LaraYul	"Moja lekcija"	Lara Šket
Leya Leanne	"Naked"	Leya Leanne, Shawn Myers, Jonas Gladnikoff
LPS	"Disko"	Filip Vidušin, Žiga Žvižej, Gašper Hlupič, Mark Semeja, Zala Velenšek, Jakob Korošec
Luma	"All In"	Lucija Harum, Martin Vogrin, Vid Turica
Marijan and Špela	"I Am So in Love"	Marijan Novak
Mia Vučković	"Telenovela"	Aleksandar Ignjatić, Senad Smajlović, Luka Radojlović
Mitja Dragan	"Iščem"	Boro Dolc, Darjo Peklar, Mitja Dragan, Fadila Prijatelj
Neli Jerot	"Magnum opus"	Neli Jerot, Nino Ošlak, Igor Pirkovič, Drago Mislej, Danilo Kocjančič, Franco Zabukovec, Domen Kumer, Petra Pečovnik
Nika S.	"Počakaj me"	Martin Lunder, Nace Jordan
Nina Sodnik	"Will You Be Enough"	Nina Sodnik, Zvone Hranjec, Tea Vindiš, Matej Sušnik, Blaž Sotošek
Stela Sofia	"Tu in zdaj"	Stela Tavzelj, Žan Serčič

==== Contestant progress ====
EMA Freš 2022 began with the first week of duels on 29 November 2021 and concluded with a live final on 28 January 2022.

–	Contestant was in the top four of the final and advanced to EMA 2022 as one of the four winners of EMA Freš
–	Contestant advanced from respective duel/weekly final/Second Chance round to the next stage
–	Contestant finished in last place from respective duel/weekly final and was given a Second Chance round in week four

Contestant	Week 1		Week 2		Week 3		Second Chance	Final
Contestant	Duels	Weekly Final	Duels	Weekly Final	Duels	Weekly Final	Second Chance	Final
LPS	Advanced	Advanced	—N/a	—N/a	—N/a	—N/a	—N/a	Advanced to EMA 2022
Luma	—N/a	—N/a	Advanced	Advanced	—N/a	—N/a	—N/a	Advanced to EMA 2022
Stela Sofia	Advanced	Advanced	—N/a	—N/a	—N/a	—N/a	—N/a	Advanced to EMA 2022
Leya Leanne	—N/a	—N/a	—N/a	—N/a	Advanced	Advanced	—N/a	Advanced to EMA 2022
De Liri	—N/a	—N/a	—N/a	—N/a	Advanced	Advanced	—N/a	Eliminated (EMA Freš 2022 Final)
Katja Kos	Second Chance	—N/a	—N/a	—N/a	—N/a	—N/a	Advanced	Eliminated (EMA Freš 2022 Final)
Anja Vodošek	Second Chance	—N/a	—N/a	—N/a	—N/a	—N/a	Advanced	Eliminated (EMA Freš 2022 Final)
Emma	—N/a	—N/a	—N/a	—N/a	Advanced	Second Chance	Advanced	Eliminated (EMA Freš 2022 Final)
Ina	—N/a	—N/a	Advanced	Advanced	—N/a	—N/a	—N/a	Eliminated (EMA Freš 2022 Final)
Jon Vitezič	Advanced	Advanced	—N/a	—N/a	—N/a	—N/a	—N/a	Eliminated (EMA Freš 2022 Final)
Jaka Hliš	—N/a	—N/a	Advanced	Advanced	—N/a	—N/a	—N/a	Eliminated (EMA Freš 2022 Final)
Nika S.	Advanced	Second Chance	—N/a	—N/a	—N/a	—N/a	Advanced	Eliminated (EMA Freš 2022 Final)
Mia Vučković	—N/a	—N/a	—N/a	—N/a	Second Chance	—N/a	Advanced	Eliminated (EMA Freš 2022 Final)
Marijan and Špela	—N/a	—N/a	—N/a	—N/a	Advanced	Advanced	—N/a	Eliminated (EMA Freš 2022 Final)
LaraYul	—N/a	—N/a	Second Chance	—N/a	—N/a	—N/a	Eliminated (Second Chance)	
Hvala Brothers	—N/a	—N/a	—N/a	—N/a	Second Chance	—N/a	Eliminated (Second Chance)	
Lara Dovier	—N/a	—N/a	Advanced	Second Chance	—N/a	—N/a	Eliminated (Second Chance)	
Ain't Harmony	—N/a	—N/a	Second Chance	—N/a	—N/a	—N/a	Eliminated (Second Chance)	
Katja Korošec	—N/a	—N/a	—N/a	—N/a	Second Chance	—N/a	Eliminated (Second Chance)	
Evita	—N/a	—N/a	Second Chance	—N/a	—N/a	—N/a	Eliminated (Second Chance)	
Mitja Dragan	—N/a	—N/a	Second Chance	—N/a	—N/a	—N/a	Eliminated (Second Chance)	
Ella	Second Chance	—N/a	—N/a	—N/a	—N/a	—N/a	Eliminated (Second Chance)	
Nina Sodnik	—N/a	—N/a	—N/a	—N/a	Second Chance	—N/a	Eliminated (Second Chance)	
Neli Jerot	Second Chance	—N/a	—N/a	—N/a	—N/a	—N/a	Eliminated (Second Chance)	

==== Duels ====
Public vote qualifier Jury vote qualifier

The first duel rounds took place between 29 November and 18 December 2021. All of the twenty-four competing entries were divided into three separate weeks. Each week featured four daily duels from Monday to Thursday with one qualifier from each duel progressing to the weekly final. The runners-up of each duel were given a Second Chance round after all of the other duels had taken place. The results were determined via an international online vote on RTVSLO's website from 8:00 (CET) to 19:00 (CET) on the day of each duel. Each week rounded up with an online webcast final that featured the four duel winners of the week. Three of the artists advanced to the final selection show, while the last place finisher advanced to the Second Chance round. The results of the weekly final were determined via a combination of both jury voting and internet voting. The jury panel that voted in the weekly finals consisted of the show presenters Bojan Cvjetićanin, who would go on to represent Slovenia in the Eurovision Song Contest 2023 as lead singer of Joker Out, Eva Boto, who represented Slovenia in the Eurovision Song Contest 2012, and Arne Međedović.

Daily Duels – Week 1
Duel	Date	Artist	Song	Votes	Result	Ref.
I	29 November 2021	Katja Kos	"Deadly Flower"	1,142	Second Chance	
I	29 November 2021	Nika S.	"Počakaj me"	1,316	Advanced	
II	30 November 2021	Anja Vodošek	"Maniac"	1,161	Second Chance	
II	30 November 2021	Stela Sofia	"Tu in zdaj"	1,974	Advanced	
III	1 December 2021	LPS	"Disko"	3,139	Advanced	
III	1 December 2021	Neli Jerot	"Magnum opus"	419	Second Chance	
IV	2 December 2021	Ella	"A sem dovolj?"	799	Second Chance	
IV	2 December 2021	Jon Vitezič	"Jesus Style"	1,536	Advanced	

Weekly Final 1 – 4 December 2021
Artist	Song	Jury	Internet		Result
Artist	Song	Jury	Votes	Rank	Result
Nika S.	"Počakaj me"	4	877	4	Second Chance
Stela Sofia	"Tu in zdaj"	3	1,295	2	Finalist
LPS	"Disko"	1	2,455	1	Finalist
Jon Vitezič	"Jesus Style"	2	977	3	Finalist

Daily Duels – Week 2
Duel	Date	Artist	Song	Votes	Result	Ref.
I	6 December 2021	Ina	"Moj dopamin"	1,174	Advanced	
I	6 December 2021	LaraYul	"Moja lekcija"	718	Second Chance	
II	7 December 2021	Ain't Harmony	"Hočem da"	1,229	Second Chance	
II	7 December 2021	Jaka Hliš	"Svoje sreče krojač"	1,295	Advanced	
III	8 December 2021	Luma	"All In"	1,159	Advanced	
III	8 December 2021	Mitja Dragan	"Iščem"	662	Second Chance	
IV	9 December 2021	Evita	"Črno-bela"	539	Second Chance	
IV	9 December 2021	Lara Dovier	"Ko sva se prvič spoznala"	1,061	Advanced	

Weekly Final 2 – 11 December 2021
Artist	Song	Jury	Internet		Result
Artist	Song	Jury	Votes	Rank	Result
Ina	"Moj dopamin"	2	660	4	Finalist
Jaka Hliš	"Svoje sreče krojač"	4	706	2	Finalist
Luma	"All In"	1	1,026	1	Finalist
Lara Dovier	"Ko sva se prvič spoznala"	3	680	3	Second Chance

Daily Duels – Week 3
Duel	Date	Artist	Song	Votes	Result	Ref.
I	13 December 2021	Hvala Brothers	"Gremo naprej"	1,310	Second Chance	
I	13 December 2021	Leya Leanne	"Naked"	1,848	Advanced	
II	14 December 2021	De Liri	"Obstajam"	1,137	Advanced	
II	14 December 2021	Katja Korošec	"Levo in desno"	780	Second Chance	
III	15 December 2021	Emma	"Moja sreča"	1,100	Advanced	
III	15 December 2021	Nina Sodnik	"Will You Be Enough"	735	Second Chance	
IV	16 December 2021	Marijan and Špela	"I Am So in Love"	1,290	Advanced	
IV	16 December 2021	Mia Vučković	"Telenovela"	741	Second Chance	

Weekly Final 3 – 18 December 2021
Artist	Song	Jury	Internet		Result
Artist	Song	Jury	Votes	Rank	Result
Leya Leanne	"Naked"	1	1,237	1	Finalist
De Liri	"Obstajam"	2	643	3	Finalist
Emma	"Moja sreča"	3	622	4	Second Chance
Marijan and Špela	"I Am So in Love"	4	733	2	Finalist

==== Second Chance ====
Advanced to final of EMA Freš

The remaining fifteen artists were given a Second Chance round between 20 and 24 December 2021. All fifteen performers were divided into five rounds, of which one from each would qualify for the final selection show. Similarly to the initial duel rounds, the results were determined by an international online vote held on RTVSLO's website.

Round	Date	Artist	Song	Votes	Result	Ref.
I	20 December 2021	Katja Korošec	"Levo in desno"	374	Eliminated	
I	20 December 2021	Katja Kos	"Deadly Flower"	535	Finalist	
I	20 December 2021	Neli Jerot	"Magnum opus"	118	Eliminated	
II	21 December 2021	Emma	"Moja sreča"	1,879	Finalist	
II	21 December 2021	LaraYul	"Moja lekcija"	1,099	Eliminated	
II	21 December 2021	Mitja Dragan	"Iščem"	355	Eliminated	
III	22 December 2021	Ain't Harmony	"Hočem da"	524	Eliminated	
III	22 December 2021	Anja Vodošek	"Maniac"	632	Finalist	
III	22 December 2021	Nina Sodnik	"Will You Be Enough"	321	Eliminated	
IV	23 December 2021	Hvala Brothers	"Gremo naprej"	713	Eliminated	
IV	23 December 2021	Mia Vučković	"Telenovela"	913	Finalist	
IV	23 December 2021	Lara Dovier	"Ko sva se prvič spoznala”	712	Eliminated	
V	24 December 2021	Ella	"A sem dovolj?"	340	Eliminated	
V	24 December 2021	Evita	"Črno-bela"	371	Eliminated	
V	24 December 2021	Nika S.	"Počakaj me"	705	Finalist	

==== Final ====
Jury qualifier Public vote qualifier

The final of EMA Freš took place on 28 January 2022 at Radiotelevizija Slovenija's Studio 1 in Ljubljana, and featured the fourteen remaining artists. The show saw four artists advance to EMA 2022, with two qualifiers determined by an expert jury panel, consisting of Maja Keuc, Maša Kljun and Matjaž Vlašič, and two by a public vote. The qualified entrants were Stela Sofia, Leya Leanne, LPS and LUMA. The show was hosted by TV presenter Melani Mekicar, singer Eva Boto, who represented Slovenia in the Eurovision Song Contest 2012, and rapper Arne Međedović. The exact running order for the show was revealed on 13 January 2022. Having only sung a small snippet of their songs live in the duel stage, between 14 January 2022 and 18 January 2022, RTVSLO released official studio cuts of the remaining fourteen entries via their social media platforms. In addition to the competing entries, co-presenters Arne Međedović performed his new single "Loverboy" and Eva Boto performed her new single "Misliš na njo".

Final – 28 January 2022
R/O	Artist	Song	Jury	Televote		Result
R/O	Artist	Song	Jury	Votes	Rank	Result
1	Mia Vučković	"Telenovela"	13	177	13	Eliminated
2	De Liri	"Obstajam"	4	173	14	Eliminated
3	Jon Vitezič	"Jesus Style"	10	624	5	Eliminated
4	Ina	"Moj dopamin"	9	324	10	Eliminated
5	Marijan and Špela	"I Am So In Love"	14	357	9	Eliminated
6	Stela Sofia	"Tu in zdaj"	8	1,204	2	Advanced
7	Leya Leanne	"Naked"	3	2,066	1	Advanced
8	Nika S.	"Počakaj me"	12	235	12	Eliminated
9	Katja Kos	"Deadly Flower"	5	276	11	Eliminated
10	Jaka Hliš	"Svoje sreče krojač"	11	543	7	Eliminated
11	Anja Vodošek	"Maniac"	6	394	8	Eliminated
12	Emma	"Moja sreča"	7	595	6	Eliminated
13	LPS	"Disko"	2	876	4	Advanced
14	Luma	"All In"	1	984	3	Advanced

=== EMA 2022 ===
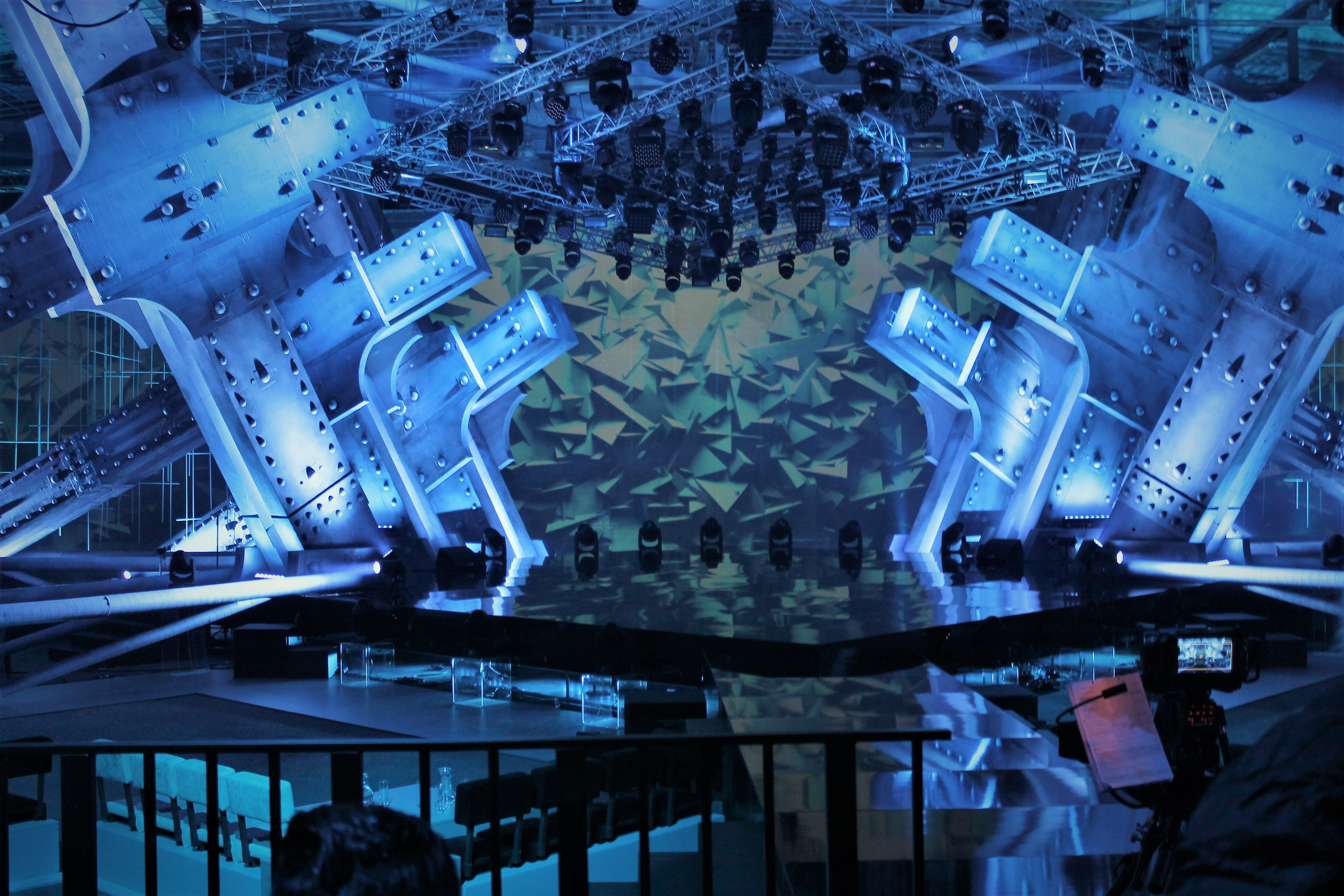
The EMA 2017 stage at the Gospodarsko razstavišče, the venue for EMA 2022

EMA 2022 was the twenty-fourth edition of Slovenia's annual national final for the Eurovision Song Contest EMA. After RTVSLO internally selected Slovenia's entrant in 2021, the broadcaster confirmed the return of the selection process on 8 October 2022. The event consisted of two semi-finals, which were held on 5 and 12 February 2022, and a grand final on 19 February 2022 at the Gospodarsko razstavišče in Ljubljana. The venue previously hosted the EMA final in 2003, 2004, 2007 and 2017. All shows were hosted by Melani Mekicar and Bojan Cvjetićanin, with Nejc Šmit reporting live from the green room in the final. The competition was broadcast on TV SLO 1, Radio Val 202, Radio Koper, Radio Maribor and online via the broadcaster's RTV 4D platform.

Prior to the final on 19 February 2022, RTVSLO also broadcast a video analysis of all performances in a podcast hosted by Jaka Dolinšek, Eva Beus and Marko Crnković.

A live after-party and analysis of the results was also broadcast on TV SLO 2 with green room host Nejc Šmit following the final.

==== Format ====
Upon announcing the return of EMA for 2022, RTVSLO revealed that, for the first time since 2017, the event would be held over three evenings. Twenty artists participated in two live semi-finals, with four newcomer acts chosen via EMA Freš and sixteen established acts chosen via a submission period opened by Radiotelevizija Slovenija in October 2021. In each semi-final, eight established artists and two newcomer (EMA Freš) artists competed to advance to the final. Public voting selected three finalists and a jury selected another three. In the final, five five-member juries (50%) and public voting (50%) decided which of the 12 finalists would represent Slovenia in Turin.

==== Competing entries ====
RTVSLO opened a submission period between 8 October 2021 and 22 November 2021 for artists and composers to submit their entries. All applicants were required to be at least sixteen years old on 1 February 2022, and the main performer (or at least half of the main performers in multi-performance ensembles) of the submitted composition must have permanent or temporary residence in the Republic of Slovenia. Two days after the closing of the submission window, RTVSLO announced a total of 127 applications had been received for both competitions. An expert jury panel consisting of Maja Keuc, Matjaž Vlašič, Žiga Pirnat, Maša Kljun and Žiga Klančar selected sixteen established acts to progress to EMA 2022. The first sixteen established competing acts were revealed on 19 December 2021, with the final newcomer four acts selected via EMA Freš on 28 January 2022. Among the competing acts were BQL, who participated in both EMA 2017 and EMA 2018 and finished as runners-up respectively, and Slovene-British performer July Jones, who wrote "Kaos" for Raiven which finished second in EMA 2019. Among the competing songwriters were Maraaya, who won EMA 2015 and represented Slovenia in the Eurovision Song Contest 2015. Raay also wrote the EMA 2014 winning song and Slovenian Eurovision entry "Round and Round" for Tinkara Kovač and wrote the Slovenian Junior Eurovision entries in both 2014 and 2015.

Established artists
Artist	Song	Songwriter(s)
Anabel	"Tendency"	Ana Teržan
Batista Cadillac	"Mim pravil"	Urban Lutman, Matija Koritnik, Martin Štibernik, Tadej Košir, Benjamin Krnetič
Bowrain and Brina	"Čas je"	Tine Grgurevič, Gregor Kosi
BQL	"Maj"	Anej Piletič, Raay, Marjetka Vovk
David Amaro	"Še vedno si lepa"	Goran Šarac, Rok Lunaček
Eva Moškon	"Kliki"	Nermin Puškar, Srečko Meolic
Gušti feat. Leyre	"Nova romantika"	Miha Guštin
Hauptman	"Sledim"	Žan Hauptman, Vid Turica
Jonatan Haller	"Obzorje"	Jonatan Haller, Satja Medvešek, Jernej Drnovšek, Miha Rednak
July Jones	"Girls Can Do Anything"	July Jones, Toby Scott
Klara Jazbec	"Vse kar imam"	Ani Cordero, Ed Fisher, Klara Jazbec
Le Serpentine	"Tud teb se lahk zgodi"	Žiga Jokić
Manouche	"Si sama?"	Robert Pikl
Mia Guček	"Independiente"	Mia Guček, Octavian Rasinariu, Patrick Jamnik
Vedran Ljubenko	"H2O dieta"	Vedran Ljubenko, Jakov Zadro
Zala Smolnikar	"V ogledalu"	Zala Smolnikar

Newcomer artists
Artist	Song	Songwriter(s)
Leya Leanne	"Naked"	Leya Leanne, Shawn Myers, Jonas Gladnikoff
LPS	"Disko"	Filip Vidušin, Žiga Žvižej, Gašper Hlupič, Mark Semeja, Zala Velenšek, Jakob Korošec
Luma	"All In"	Lucija Harum, Martin Vogrin, Vid Turica
Stela Sofia	"Tu in zdaj"	Stela Tavzelj, Žan Serčič

==== Semi-finals ====
The two semi-finals took place on 5 and 12 February 2022 at 20:20 (CET) and were broadcast on TV SLO 1. Each show featured ten performances, eight established artists and two newcomer artists, with six qualifying to the EMA 2022 final based on votes from a jury vote and public vote. The running order for the semi-finals was revealed on 19 January 2022, with 30 second snippets of all of the established competing performances revealed by RTVSLO from 20 to 21 January 2022. The songs were also promoted with further interviews and snippets on Radio Val 202 on 2 and 3 February 2022. Both semi-finals were opened with a Eurovision medley performance from co-host Bojan Cvjetićanin with "Uvodna točka EME 2022".

Jury qualifier Public vote qualifier

Semi-final 1 – 5 February 2022
R/O	Artist	Song	Jury	Televote		Result
R/O	Artist	Song	Jury	Votes	Rank	Result
1	July Jones	"Girls Can Do Anything"	1	527	7	Finalist
2	David Amaro	"Še vedno si lepa"	4	348	8	Finalist
3	Le Serpentine	"Tud teb se lahk zgodi"	9	669	4	Eliminated
4	Bowrain and Brina	"Čas je"	10	576	6	Eliminated
5	Luma	"All In"	2	1,009	2	Finalist
6	Stela Sofia	"Tu in zdaj"	7	1,509	1	Finalist
7	Jonatan Haller	"Obzorje"	6	273	9	Eliminated
8	Batista Cadillac	"Mim pravil"	3	598	5	Finalist
9	Zala Smolnikar	"V ogledalu"	8	262	10	Eliminated
10	Manouche	"Si sama?"	5	960	3	Finalist

Semi-final 2 – 12 February 2022
R/O	Artist	Song	Jury	Televote		Result
R/O	Artist	Song	Jury	Votes	Rank	Result
1	Mia Guček	"Independiente"	9	720	4	Eliminated
2	Gušti feat. Leyre	"Nova romantika"	3	448	8	Finalist
3	Klara Jazbec	"Vse kar imam"	8	206	9	Eliminated
4	Vedran Ljubenko	"H2O dieta"	7	166	10	Eliminated
5	Leya Leanne	"Naked"	6	1,779	1	Finalist
6	LPS	"Disko"	1	1,671	2	Finalist
7	Anabel	"Tendency"	4	463	7	Finalist
8	BQL	"Maj"	5	848	3	Finalist
9	Hauptman	"Sledim"	2	550	6	Finalist
10	Eva Moškon	"Kliki"	10	661	5	Eliminated

==== Final ====
The final took place on 19 February 2022 at 20:20 (CET) and was broadcast on TV SLO 1, Radio Val 202, Radio Koper, Radio Maribor and via a live satellite broadcast on the broadcaster's website www.rtvslo.si. The show featured the twelve acts that qualified from the semi-finals. The combination of points from five thematical juries and a public vote selected LPS with "Disko" to represent Slovenia in Turin. The juries consisted of members from OGAE Slovenia, songwriters, radio and television personalities and music performers. The running order for the final was revealed on 14 February 2022. In addition to the competing entries, co-host Bojan Cvjetićanin and 2011 Slovenian entrant Amaya performed a cover of the winning entry of the Eurovision Song Contest 2021 for Italy "Zitti e buoni".

Final – 19 February 2022
R/O	Artist	Song	Jury	Televote		Total	Place
R/O	Artist	Song	Jury	Votes	Points	Total	Place
1	Anabel	"Tendency"	10	545	0	10	11
2	Stela Sofia	"Tu in zdaj"	8	962	15	23	10
3	Manouche	"Si sama?"	28	1,412	25	53	6
4	Leya Leanne	"Naked"	8	1,018	20	28	9
5	BQL	"Maj"	19	2,441	50	69	3
6	Gušti feat. Leyre	"Nova romantika"	28	946	10	38	7
7	July Jones	"Girls Can Do Anything"	32	1,655	30	62	5
8	David Amaro	"Še vedno si lepa"	2	447	0	2	12
9	LPS	"Disko"	43	3,151	60	103	1
10	Hauptman	"Sledim"	29	833	5	34	8
11	Luma	"All In"	33	1,770	35	68	4
12	Batista Cadillac	"Mim pravil"	50	2,132	40	90	2

Detailed thematic jury votes
R/O	Song	OGAE	Songwriters	Radio	Television	Musicians	Total
1	"Tendency"	4	2		3	1	10
2	"Tu in zdaj"	7		1			8
3	"Si sama?"	2	7	7	4	8	28
4	"Naked"		1	2		5	8
5	"Maj"	5	3	3	2	6	19
6	"Nova romantika"	3	6	10	5	4	28
7	"Girls Can Do Anything"	10	5	4	6	7	32
8	"Še vedno si lepa"	1			1		2
9	"Disko"	8	10	5	10	10	43
10	"Sledim"		8	12	7	2	29
11	"All In"	12	4	6	8	3	33
12	"Mim pravil"	6	12	8	12	12	50

Members of the Jury
Jury	Members
OGAE Slovenia	Eva Mavrič; Maja Tilinger; Erik Sedevčič; Boštjan Smrekar; Miran Cvetko
Songwriters	Matjaž Vlašič; Miha Gorše; Gregor Strasbergar; Matevž Šalehar; Gašper Šantl
Radio personalities	Anita Gošte (Radio Aktual); Anja Ramšak (Radio 1); Blaž Maljevac (Radio Koper); Gregor Stermecki (Radio Maribor); Žiga Klančar (Val 202)
Television personalities	Anja Möderndorfer; Dajana Makovec; Tina Novak; Den Baruca; Lorella Flego
Music performers	Tinkara Kovač – singer, represented Slovenia in the Eurovision Song Contest 2014; Lea Sirk – singer, represented Slovenia in the Eurovision Song Contest 2018; Raiven – singer-songwriter, three time participant in EMA, represented Slovenia in the Eurovision Song Contest 2024; Eva Boto – singer, broadcaster, represented Slovenia in the Eurovision Song Contest 2012; Eva Hren – singer, producer

=== Ratings ===
Viewing figures by show
Show	Date	Viewing figures		Ref.
Show	Date	Nominal	Share	Ref.
EMA Freš final	28 January 2022	153,500	17%	
Semi-final 1	5 February 2022	148,600	16%	
Semi-final 2	12 February 2022	126,100	15%	
Final	19 February 2022	234,800	27%	

=== Promotion ===
LPS made several appearances across Europe and in Slovenia to specifically promote "Disko" as the Slovenian Eurovision entry. The band first performed at the Eurovision in Concert at Amsterdam's AFAS Live on 9 April, which was hosted by Edsilia Rombley and Cornald Maas. Having made several appearances across Slovenian television, the band travelled to Zagreb, Croatia where they appeared on the Zvijezde pjevaju show alongside the Serbian entrant Konstrakta on 16 April 2022.

On 11 April 2022, an accompanying music video was released by the band and was uploaded to the Eurovision YouTube channel. On 9 May 2022, the day before the first semi-final, the band released an English language version of the song.

== At Eurovision ==
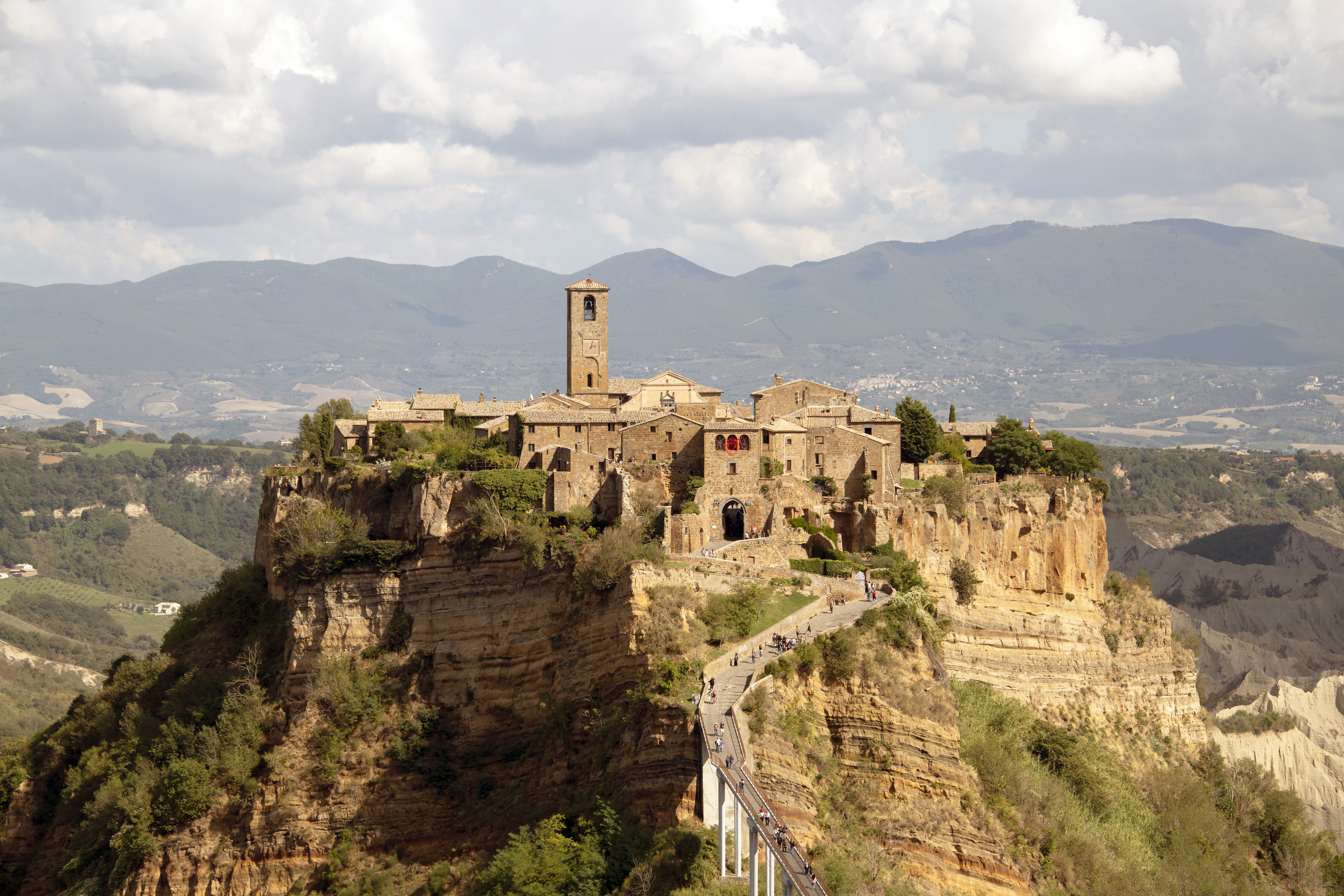
A video postcard introduced LPS' performance in the first semi-final of the Eurovision Song Contest 2022. The postcard was filmed in the small Italian town of Civita di Bagnoregio in the Province of Viterbo and featured virtual projections of the band across the location.

According to Eurovision rules, all nations with the exceptions of the host country and the "Big Five" (France, Germany, Italy, Spain and the United Kingdom) are required to qualify from one of two semi-finals in order to compete for the final; the top ten countries from each semi-final progress to the final. The European Broadcasting Union (EBU) split up the competing countries into six different pots based on voting patterns from previous contests, with countries with favourable voting histories put into the same pot. On 25 January 2022, an allocation draw was held which placed each country into one of the two semi-finals, as well as which half of the show they would perform in. Slovenia was placed into the first semi-final, which was held on 10 May 2022, and was scheduled to perform in the first half of the show.

Once all the competing songs for the 2022 contest had been released, the running order for the semi-finals was decided by the shows' producers rather than through another draw, so that similar songs were not placed next to each other. Slovenia was set to perform in position 5, following the entry from Switzerland and before the entry from Ukraine.

In Slovenia, the semi-finals were broadcast on TV SLO 2 and the final was broadcast on TV SLO 1, with commentary by Andrej Hofer. The first semi-final and the final were also broadcast on Radio Maribor, Radio Val 202 and on RTVSLO's 4D platform, with commentary by Maruša Kerec. The Slovene spokesperson, who announced the top 12-point score awarded by the Slovenian jury during the final, was Lorella Flego, who previously announced the points for Slovenia in both 2012 and 2021.

=== Semi-final ===
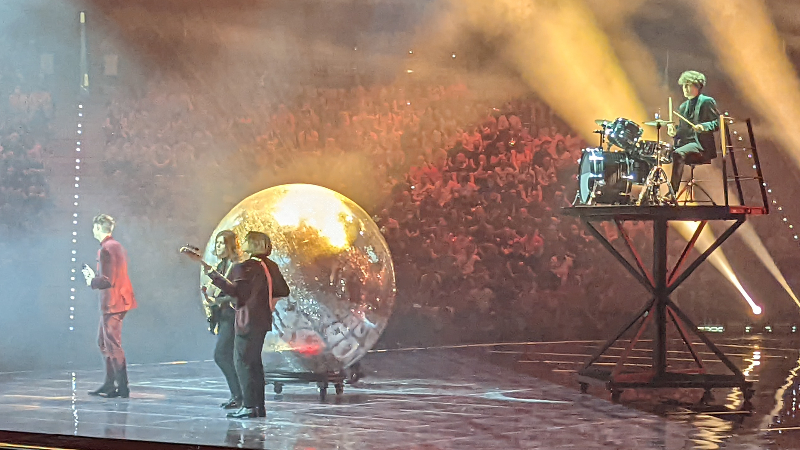
LPS performing on the stage during the first semi-final.

LPS took part in technical rehearsals on 30 April and 4 May, followed by dress rehearsals on 9 and 10 May. This included the jury show on 9 May where the professional juries of each country watched and voted on the competing entries.

The Slovenian performance featured LPS scattered across the stage encircling a giant disco ball, with drummer Gašper Hlupič positioned above the disco ball on a tall black drum kit. The band members were dressed in 1960s inspired suits with burgundy being the predominant colour theme of the performance. The camera work was carried out in a way that rotated around the disco ball and band members for the entirety of the Slovenian show.

At the end of the show, Slovenia was not announced among the top 10 entries in the first semi-final and therefore failed to qualify to compete in the final. This was the second consecutive absence of Slovenia from the final, having last appeared in 2019. It was later revealed that Slovenia placed seventeenth (last) in the semi-final, receiving a total of just 15 points: 8 points from the televoting and 7 points from the juries. This marked Slovenia's worst Eurovision performance since 2013 and the second time the nation finished in last place in the semi-final.

=== Voting ===
Below is a breakdown of points awarded to Slovenia during the first semi-final. Voting during the three shows involved each country awarding two sets of points from 1-8, 10 and 12: one from their professional jury and the other from televoting. The exact composition of the professional jury, and the results of each country's jury and televoting were released after the final; the individual results from each jury member were also released in an anonymised form. The Slovenian jury consisted of Alenka Godec, Arne Međedović, Gaber Radojevič, Lucija Harum, and Tilen Artač. In the first semi-final, Slovenia finished in seventeenth place out of seventeen entries, marking Slovenia's first last place finish in a Eurovision semi-final since 2013 attaining only 15 points. Over the course of the contest, Slovenia awarded its 12 points to Lithuania (jury) and Croatia (televote) in the first semi-final, and to Italy (jury) and Serbia (televote) in the final.

==== Points awarded to Slovenia ====
Points awarded to Slovenia (Semi-final 1)
Score	Televote	Jury
12 points		
10 points		
8 points	Croatia	
7 points		
6 points		
5 points		Croatia
4 points		
3 points		
2 points		
1 point		Moldova; Netherlands

==== Points awarded by Slovenia ====
Points awarded by Slovenia (Semi-final 1)
Score	Televote	Jury
12 points	Croatia	Lithuania
10 points	Ukraine	Netherlands
8 points	Greece	Croatia
7 points	Moldova	Ukraine
6 points	Albania	Portugal
5 points	Lithuania	Greece
4 points	Norway	Switzerland
3 points	Netherlands	Latvia
2 points	Portugal	Norway
1 point	Denmark	Armenia

Points awarded by Slovenia (Final)
Score	Televote	Jury
12 points	Serbia	Italy
10 points	Ukraine	Lithuania
8 points	Greece	Ukraine
7 points	Moldova	Netherlands
6 points	Italy	Serbia
5 points	Sweden	Switzerland
4 points	Spain	Greece
3 points	Norway	Portugal
2 points	Lithuania	United Kingdom
1 point	Netherlands	Spain

==== Detailed voting results ====
The following members comprised the Slovene jury:

- Alenka Godec – singer
- Arne Međedović – rapper, TV host, co-presenter of Slovenia's national selection
- Gaber Radojevič – music producer, composer, audio engineer
- Lucija Harum – singer-songwriter, producer, participated in Slovenia's 2022 Eurovision selection as a part of Luma
- Tilen Artač – cellist, TV presenter

Detailed voting results from Slovenia (Semi-final 1)
R/O	Country	Jury							Televote	
R/O	Country	Juror 1	Juror 2	Juror 3	Juror 4	Juror 5	Rank	Points	Rank	Points
01	Albania	12	15	16	13	15	15		5	6
02	Latvia	9	8	9	9	8	8	3	15	
03	Lithuania	1	3	7	2	1	1	12	6	5
04	Switzerland	7	5	4	5	2	7	4	14	
05	Slovenia									
06	Ukraine	5	1	6	6	4	4	7	2	10
07	Bulgaria	16	16	14	16	16	16		16	
08	Netherlands	2	6	3	1	6	2	10	8	3
09	Moldova	15	10	11	10	12	11		4	7
10	Portugal	3	4	1	7	9	5	6	9	2
11	Croatia	6	2	5	3	3	3	8	1	12
12	Denmark	13	13	8	11	14	12		10	1
13	Austria	14	14	15	12	13	14		13	
14	Iceland	11	11	12	15	10	13		12	
15	Greece	4	7	2	4	5	6	5	3	8
16	Norway	8	12	10	8	7	9	2	7	4
17	Armenia	10	9	13	14	11	10	1	11	

Detailed voting results from Slovenia (Final)
R/O	Country	Jury							Televote	
R/O	Country	Juror 1	Juror 2	Juror 3	Juror 4	Juror 5	Rank	Points	Rank	Points
01	Czech Republic	18	17	13	15	20	17		22	
02	Romania	20	25	25	25	25	25		17	
03	Portugal	6	3	10	9	21	8	3	13	
04	Finland	25	22	24	24	23	24		11	
05	Switzerland	4	11	6	12	5	6	5	16	
06	France	24	16	16	19	24	20		20	
07	Norway	14	13	12	17	3	12		8	3
08	Armenia	10	18	18	22	19	16		21	
09	Italy	1	2	7	1	1	1	12	5	6
10	Spain	12	10	9	6	9	10	1	7	4
11	Netherlands	7	5	1	4	7	4	7	10	1
12	Ukraine	3	6	2	5	4	3	8	2	10
13	Germany	19	14	19	16	18	19		15	
14	Lithuania	2	12	4	3	2	2	10	9	2
15	Azerbaijan	11	7	14	14	13	14		25	
16	Belgium	8	19	21	7	10	13		19	
17	Greece	9	4	11	8	6	7	4	3	8
18	Iceland	22	20	20	20	17	21		24	
19	Moldova	21	21	23	23	22	23		4	7
20	Sweden	17	8	5	10	11	11		6	5
21	Australia	16	15	15	13	12	15		23	
22	United Kingdom	15	9	3	11	8	9	2	14	
23	Poland	23	23	22	21	15	22		18	
24	Serbia	5	1	8	2	14	5	6	1	12
25	Estonia	13	24	17	18	16	18		12	
