= July Jones =

British-Slovenian singer and songwriter (born 1998)

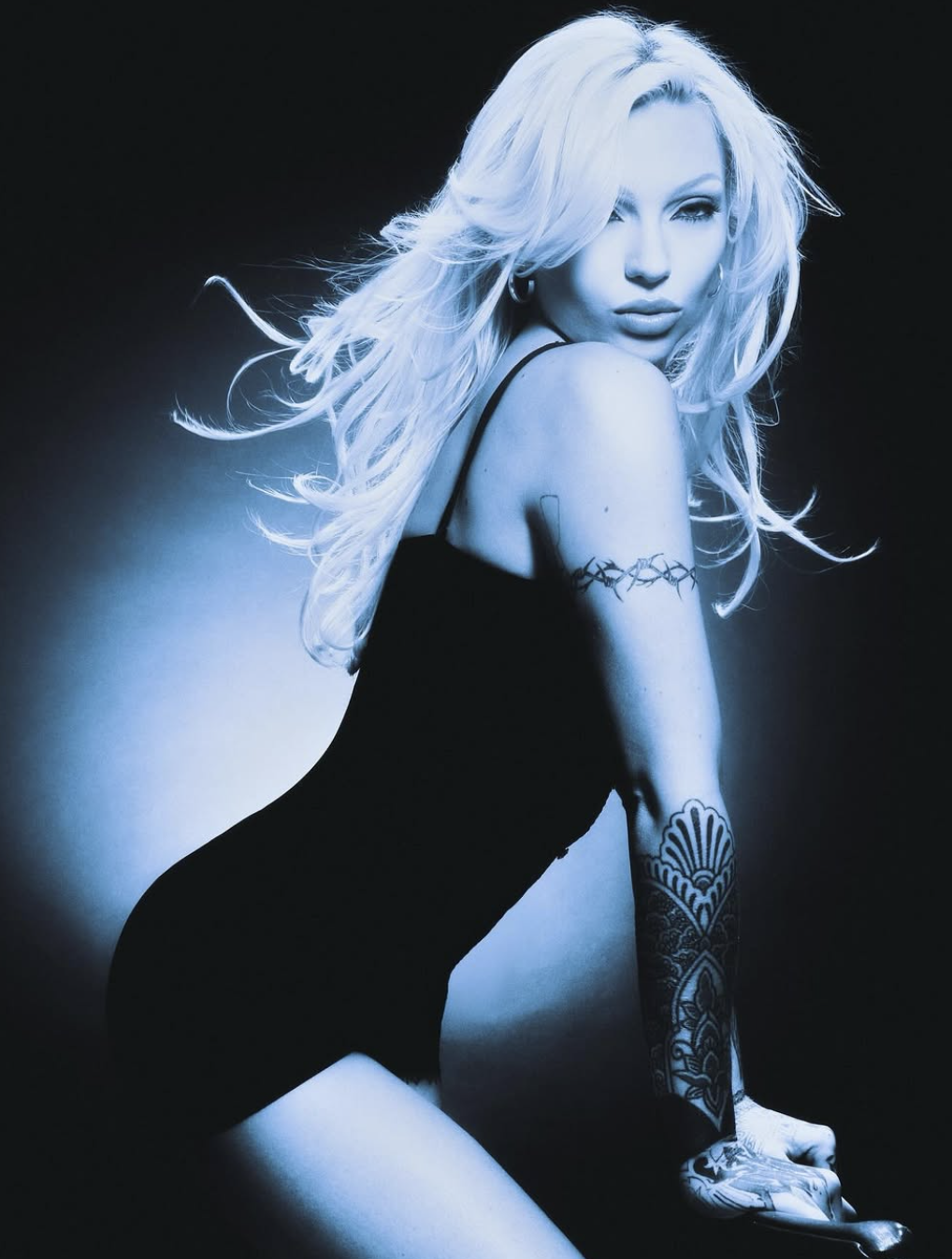

Background information
- Born: 3 July 1998 (age 27)
- Genres: Pop
- Occupations: Singer; songwriter; record producer
- Label: Seven 7 Rights Management

July Jones (born 3 July 1998), is a British-Slovenian singer, songwriter and music producer.

== Biography ==
July Jones was born in Ljubljana, Slovenia, where she developed a deep love for music from an early age. Recognizing her passion, her mother enrolled her in a music school, where she studied flute, singing, and piano. Eager to expand her musical education, she left Slovenia as a teenager to join a program in the United States, where she immersed herself in music studies.

Following this experience, Jones auditioned for Berklee College of Music, but ultimately chose to move to London at 17 to pursue a career in pop music. With no industry connections, she spent her first year busking on the streets and couch-surfing while trying to establish herself.

Jones' songwriting career took off when she began working with artists such as Girli, co-writing More Than a Friend and Has Been for her album. She went on to collaborate with Raiven, co-writing her album REM, and worked with global artists including BTS, Brooke Candy, Amaya, and Trevor Daniel. Despite finding success as a songwriter, Jones remained determined to establish herself as an artist in her own right.

In 2022, she shifted her focus to her solo career, releasing her first mixtape Silly Little Dream and competing in EMA 2022 with the song Girls Can Do Anything. The following year, she received the Music Moves Europe Award for Best New European Artist, providing her with an increased recognition in the European music industry.

In 2025, Jones returned to EMA with her song "New Religion", competing for the chance to represent Slovenia in the Eurovision Song Contest 2025. She finished up in second place, losing to Klemen Slakonja.

== Personal life ==
Jones is an openly LGBTQ+ person. She is an advocate for women's rights and LGBTQ+ rights. She is also openly battling epilepsy, which she was diagnosed with at the age of 20.

== Discography ==
=== EPs ===
Title	Details
Girls Can Do Anything	Released: 25 February 2022; Label: S7 Inc.; Format: Digital download, streaming
Silly Little Dream, Pt. 1	Released: 8 April 2022; Label: S7 Inc.; Format: Digital download, streaming

=== Singles ===
List of singles as lead artist
Title	Year	Album
"Butterflies" (with Suzi Wu featuring Girli)	2021	Girls Can Do Anything
"Aladdin"	2021	Girls Can Do Anything
"Air"	2021	Girls Can Do Anything
"Muse"	2022	Non-album singles
"Majesty"	2023	Non-album singles
"Beautiful People"	2023	Non-album singles
"Flower Girl"	2023	Non-album singles
"Cry When I Cum"	2024	Non-album singles
"Riot"	2024	Non-album singles
"New Religion"	2025	Non-album singles
"Body of Work"	2025	Non-album singles
"Hysteria"	2026	Non-album singles
