= How Much Time Do We Have Left =

2025 song by Klemen

Single by Klemen

from the album Golden Hour
- Released: 25 January 2025
- Length: 3:03
- Label: Universal Music Slovenia
- Songwriter: Klemen Slakonja
- Producers: Maja Slatinšek; Ryan Small

Music video
- "How Much Time Do We Have Left" on YouTube

Eurovision Song Contest 2025 entry
- Country: Slovenia
- Artist: Klemen
- Language: English
- Composer: Klemen Slakonja
- Lyricist: Klemen Slakonja

Finals performance
- Semi-final result: 13th
- Semi-final points: 23

Entry chronology
- ◄ "Veronika" (2024)

"How Much Time Do We Have Left" is a song by Slovenian actor, comedian, television host, and singer-songwriter Klemen. It was written by Klemen and produced by Maja Slatinšek and Ryan Small. It was released on 25 January 2025 as part of the album for the EMA 2025, which it later won, and it represented Slovenia in the Eurovision Song Contest 2025.

== Background and composition ==
"How Much Time Do We Have Left" was written and composed entirely by Klemen Slakonja and produced with the help of Maja Slatinšek and Ryan Small. The song deals with the period in which his wife, actress Mojca Fatur, was diagnosed with myelodysplastic syndrome, a rare form of cancer from which she later managed to recover. Through his words, Klemen celebrates the strength of his beloved in facing the disease, highlighting the importance of shared time and the fragility of human life.

== Eurovision Song Contest ==
=== EMA 2025 ===
EMA 2025 was the twenty-fifth edition of EMA, the format used by RTVSLO to select its entry for the Eurovision Song Contest. In the first round, five thematic jury panels, each composed of five members, each distributed their points following the same pattern used in the Eurovision Song Contest, i.e. 1–8, 10 and 12 points and selected two entries to proceed to the second round; these panels consisted of music performers, songwriters and producers, radio and television personalities, members of OGAE Slovenia, and international Eurovision influencers and journalists. In the superfinal, televoting exclusively determined the winner.

On 13 December 2024, Klemen were confirmed as one of the 12 participants in EMA 2025 with the song "How Much Time Do We Have Left". The song won EMA 2025 on 1 February 2025 by two rounds of voting, thus qualifying the song to represent Slovenia at the Eurovision Song Contest.

=== At Eurovision ===
The Eurovision Song Contest 2025 took place at St. Jakobshalle in Basel, Switzerland, and consisted of two semi-finals held on the respective dates of 13 and 15 May and the final on 17 May 2025. During the allocation draw held on 28 January 2025, Slovenia was drawn to compete in the first semi-final, performing in the first half of the show. The song failed to qualify for the Grand Final.

== Release history ==
Release history and formats for "How Much Time Do We Have Left"
Country	Date	Format(s)	Label	Ref.
Various	1 February 2025	Digital download; streaming	Universal Music Slovenia	
