= It's Just My Opinion =

Studio album by Girli
- Released: 8 May 2026
- Genre: Pop
- Length: 35:27
- Label: Believe
- Producer: Jack Bowden; Trevor Brown; Georgia Flipo; Ross Gilmartin; Aidan Hogg; Dan Holloway; King Ed; Jack Kleinick; Zaire Koalo

Girli chronology
Matriarchy (2024)	It's Just My Opinion (2026)

Singles from It's Just My Opinion
- 1. "Better Undressed" Released: 12 November 2025; 2. "Slap On The Wrist" Released: 20 January 2026; 3. "Romantic Sadness" Released: 20 February 2026; 4. "Squirm" Released: 31 March 2026

It's Just My Opinion (stylized in all lowercase) is the third studio album by the English singer Girli. It was released on 8 May 2026 by Believe Music.

== Background ==
The lead single, "Better Undressed", released on 12 November 2025, was described by Diva's Ella Gauci as a queer alternative pop breakup anthem about the difficulty of maintaining "no contact" after a relationship ends. The second single, "Slap on the Wrist", was released alongside a protest-themed music video addressing misogyny, victim-blaming, and violence against women.

== Critical reception ==
Professional ratings
Review scores
Source	Rating
Clash	7/10

Writing for Clash, Yasmin Cowan praised the album for its emotional honesty and thematic ambition, describing the album as "a raw, intimate expression of girli's innermost thoughts and feelings". The review highlighted the record's exploration of feminism, queerness and identity, while noting its blend of alternative pop, indie rock and punk influences. Cowan also commended girli's lyricism and vocal delivery, writing that the album "balances vulnerability with empowerment" and presents "a more mature and refined sound" than her previous work.

== Track listing ==
All lyrics are written by Milly Toomey.

It's Just My Opinion track listing
No.	Title	Music	Producer(s)	Length
1.	"Blue Sky"	Milly Toomey; Ross Gilmartin	Gilmartin	3:01
2.	"Slap on the Wrist"	Toomey; Aidan Hogg; Maude Latour	Hogg	2:38
3.	"Pedestal"	Toomey; Sarah Blanchard; Edward Carlile; Georgia Meek	King Ed	2:30
4.	"Don't Make Me Cry"	Toomey; Jackie Apostel; Dan Holloway	Holloway	4:04
5.	"Bones"	Toomey; Apostel; Holloway	Holloway	2:58
6.	"Lifestyle"	Toomey; Sara Davis; Hogg	Hogg	3:13
7.	"Romantic Sadness"	Toomey; Gilmartin	Gilmartin	2:52
8.	"Squirm"	Toomey; Florence Arman; Jack Bowden	Bowden	2:28
9.	"Light in the Dark"	Toomey; Trevor Brown; Zaire Koalo; Stephen Wrabel	Brown; Koalo	3:30
10.	"Traces"	Toomey; Jack Kleinick	Kleinick	2:21
11.	"Better Undressed"	Toomey; Georgia Flipo; Hogg	Flipo; Hogg	3:09
12.	"The Answer"	Toomey; Davis; Hogg	Hogg	2:43
Total length:				35:27

== Personnel ==
Credits are adapted from Tidal.

- Milly Toomey – vocals, backing vocals
- Chris Zane – mixing (all tracks), engineering (track 3)
- Cicely Balston – mastering
- Ross Gilmartin – guitar, programming, synthesizer, engineering (1, 7); vocal effects (1); acoustic guitar, electric bass guitar, electric guitar (7)
- Aidan Hogg – bass, guitar (2, 6, 11, 12); programming (2, 11, 12), synthesizer (6, 11, 12)
- Chloe Arnow – drums (2, 5, 12)
- King Ed – bass, drums, guitar, piano, programming, synthesizer, engineering (3)
- Dan Holloway – electric guitar, keyboards, programming (4, 5); acoustic guitar, bass (4)
- Jack Bowden – bass, electric guitar, keyboards, synthesizer (8)
- Zaire Koalo – drums, keyboards, engineering (9)
- Trevor Brown – keyboards, engineering (9)
- Stephen Wrabel – keyboards (9)
- Jack Kleinick – electric guitar, keyboards, programming (10)
- Georgia Flipo – backing vocals, drums (11)

== Charts ==
Chart performance for It's Just My Opinion
Chart (2026)	Peak position
Scottish Albums (OCC)	16
UK Albums (OCC)	80
UK Independent Albums (OCC)	6
