= Disko (song) =

2022 song by LPS

Single by LPS
- Language: Slovene
- Released: 27 November 2021
- Length: 2:59
- Label: Self-released
- Songwriters: Filip Vidušin; Žiga Žvižej; Gašper Hlupič; Mark Semeja; Zala Velenšek; Jakob Korošec

LPS singles chronology
"Silence in My Head" (2022)	"Disko" (2021)

Music video
- "Disko" on YouTube

Eurovision Song Contest 2022 entry
- Country: Slovenia
- Artist: LPS

Finals performance
- Semi-final result: 17th
- Semi-final points: 15

Entry chronology
- ◄ "Amen" (2021)
- "Carpe Diem" (2023) ►

"Disko" (Slovene pronunciation: [ˈdíːskɔ]) is a 2022 song by Slovenian pop band Last Pizza Slice. The song represented Slovenia in the Eurovision Song Contest 2022 in Turin, Italy, after winning EMA 2022, Slovenia's national final.

== Release ==
The song was released on 26 November 2021, along with all other songs competing in EMA 2022. It was officially released to streaming services on 1 April.

== Music video ==
An animated music video of "Disko" would come out on 11 April, with artwork by Manca Matelič, a school classmate of the band, and Matevž Bervar. The video features a man getting dumped by his girlfriend at a nightclub. The man ends up being depressed, drinking at the nightclub. One day, while seeing his ex-girlfriend kiss her boyfriend at a bridge, the man falls over into a river. While it is unknown if the man drowned or hallucinated, underwater, he eventually meets another girl, and becomes happy again.

The music video is inspired by the lead singer, Filip Vidušin, having a real life experience of getting dumped at a disco and watching his ex-girlfriend dance with another man.

== Eurovision Song Contest ==
=== EMA 2022 and EMA Freš 2022 ===
In December 2021, Last Pizza Slice with "Disko" took part in the EMA preliminary competition, called EMA Freš 2022. The following month, the song was selected as one of four entries for the EMA 2022. In the second semi-final on 12 February 2022, "Disko" qualified for the grand final. In the grand final a week later, the song won with the highest score from the viewers and the second highest score from the jury, and therefore qualified for the Eurovision Song Contest 2022.

=== At Eurovision ===
Slovenia was placed into the first semi-final, held on 10 May 2022, and performed in the first half of the show. They failed to qualify for the final after finishing in last place in the first semi-final with only 15 points.

== Charts ==
Chart performance for "Disko"
Chart (2022)	Peak position
Lithuania (AGATA)	35
