= Girli =

English singer-songwriter (born 1997)

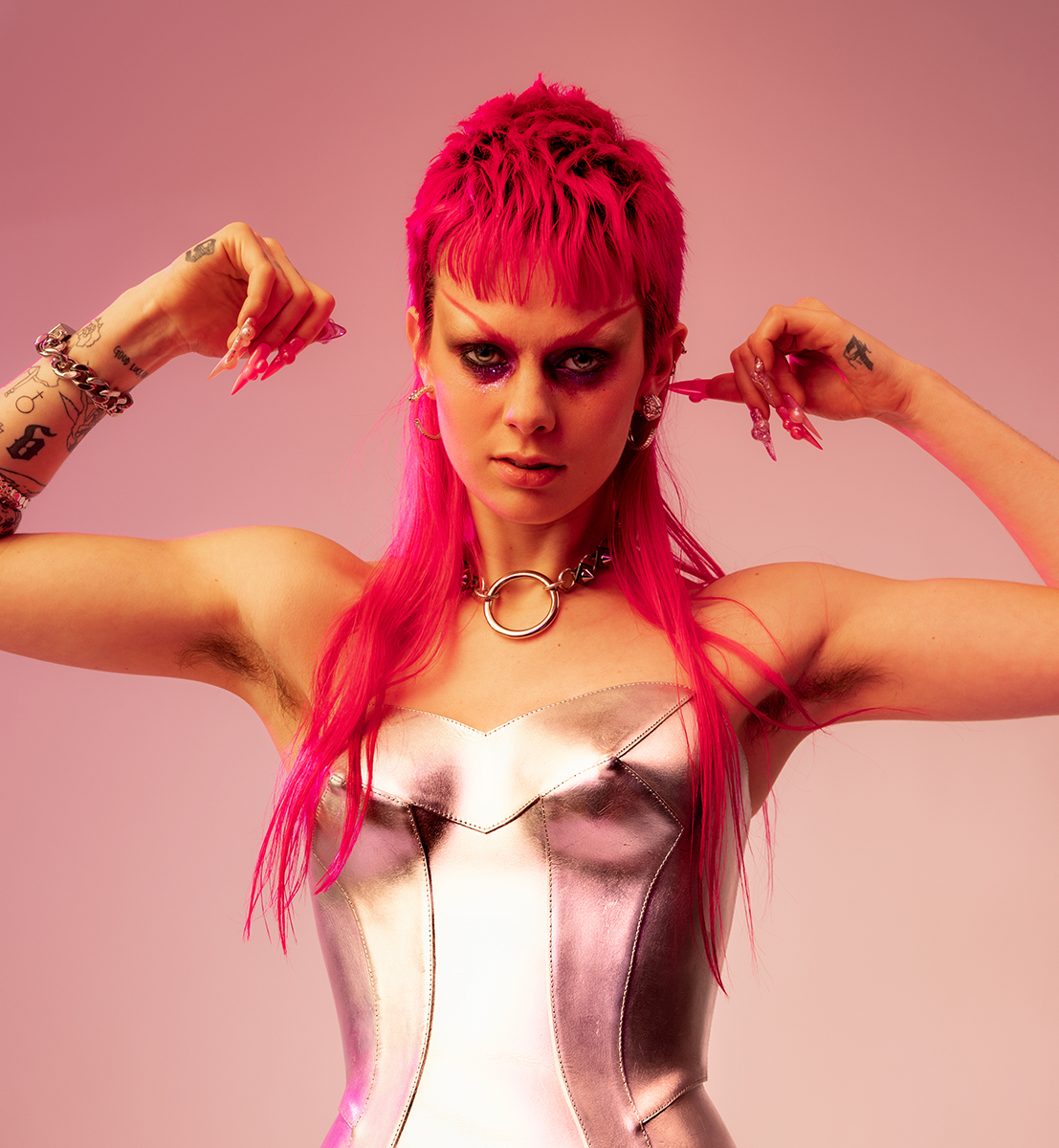
- Girli photographed for Paper Magazine, 2022

Background information
- Born: Amelia Kate Woodward Toomey; 6 December 1997 (age 28)
- Origin: London, England
- Genres: Pop; electropop; pop punk; pop rap
- Occupations: Singer; rapper; songwriter
- Instruments: Vocals; guitar
- Years active: 2014–present
- Labels: Virgin EMI; PMR
- Website: girlimusic.com

Amelia Kate Woodward Toomey (born 6 December 1997), known professionally as Girli, is an English singer, rapper and songwriter. Based in London, she has released a number of singles, five EPs and three studio albums. The Guardian has described her sound as veering "between PC Music, bubblegum pop, pop punk and rap, each one treading a line between catchy and deliberately discomforting." Much of her music is about feminism, sexuality, queer culture, and mental health.

In April 2019, Girli released her debut studio album, Odd One Out, on PMR Records. After being dropped by her record label and later being forced to cancel her 2020 Sofa Tour due to the COVID-19 pandemic, Girli released the EP Ex Talk in 2021. She is currently with independent label AllPoints and released her second album Matriarchy in 2024.

== Early life ==
Girli is from northwest London. She was born on 6 December 1997 to acting parents, and is half-Australian. She has a younger sister. As a child she wanted to be an actor, but abandoned her ambition after 2 unsuccessful auditions. She wrote her first song aged 8, about a boy in her class at school who she liked.

She attended Hampstead School, a comprehensive secondary school in Cricklewood. Girli describes her experience of secondary school as "the worst five years of my life, it was so bad", experiencing bullying that "made me quite an anxious person". She was nonetheless active in extracurricular activities, getting elected as a Deputy Young MP for Camden in 2012 and spending lunchtimes in the music room playing instruments.

== Career ==
Girli realised that she wanted to be a musician aged 14 after feeling inspired at a Tegan and Sara concert. She started her career doing open mics under her legal name, Milly Toomey. She later formed indie rock band Ask Martin with older girls she met online, performing vocals and guitar. After her bandmates went away to university, Girli started performing solo.

Girli attended the East London Arts & Music college in Bromley-by-Bow from 2014 to 2016. During that period she developed interests in beatmaking, rap, and drum and bass, and made her musical debut as Girli. She released her first single, "So You Think You Can Fuck with Me Do Ya?" in 2015, aged 17. She was signed by PMR Records in October 2015.

In 2016, Girli toured the UK throughout September and October supporting musician Oscar.

In 2017, Girli released the Feel OK EP, supported Declan McKenna around the UK and performed at Latitude Festival. She also had a headline UK tour, titled "Hot Mess", in support of an EP of the same name which was released in October 2017 and showed elements of pop punk.

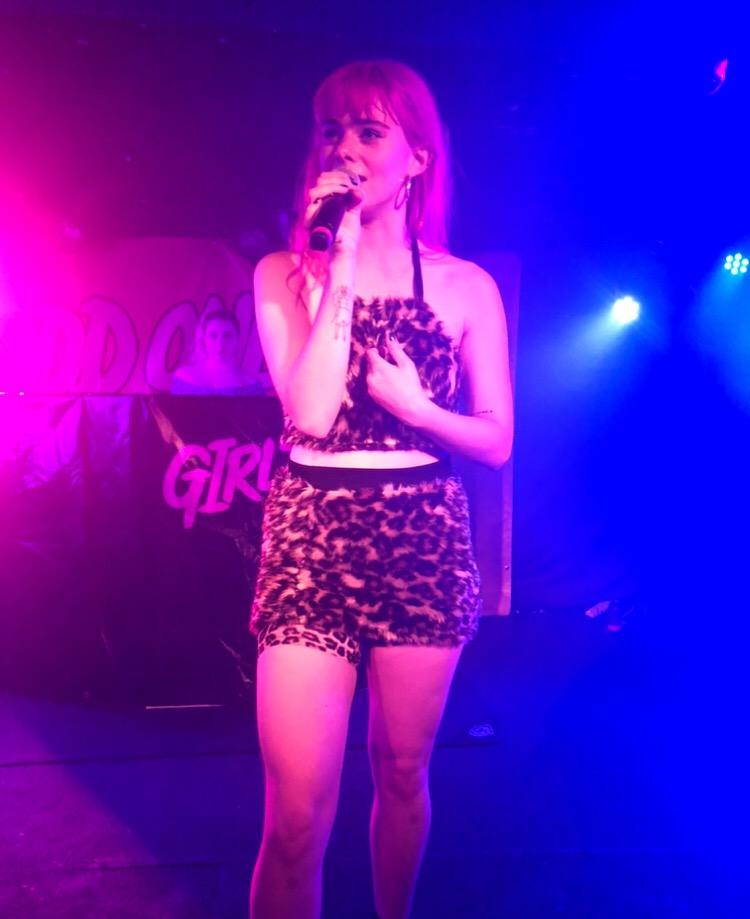
Girli performing in 2019

In 2018, Girli performed at the MTV Presents Gibraltar Calling festival. In 2019, she released the single "Deal With It" and released her debut studio album, Odd One Out, four years after her debut single. In July 2019, Girli released the single "Up & Down". Later in 2019, Girli was dropped by her record label. She wrote her subsequent single "Has Been" in response, stating on Instagram, "This song is for my ex record label who didn't think I was perfect or pop star enough to sell records." Girli was due to take her Sofa Tour around the UK in March 2020, but cancelled the dates due to the COVID-19 pandemic. Her first EP on the independent record label AllPoints, Ex Talk, was released in February 2021.

Girli previously performed on stage with DJ Kitty (Rosalie Sylvia Fountain), who provided backing vocals. DJ Kitty was later replaced by DJ GG, after DJ Kitty resigned due to other commitments.

In 2024, she released her second album, Matriarchy, which Renowned for Sound described as "a hard-hitting pop album that gives Girli's ‘mainstream' counterparts a run for their money".

== Artistry ==
=== Influences ===
Girli has cited a diverse range of influences including Tove Lo, the Arctic Monkeys, Lily Allen, the Slits, M.I.A, Spice Girls, Scissor Sisters, PC music, Kyary Pamyu Pamyu, and more 'left field' artists such as 070 Shake, Caroline Polachek, Fletcher, and Grimes. Discussing the inspiration behind her stage name, she cited the rock band Blondie, saying she wanted "a name that embodied a female pop star". She has also mentioned her home city of London, particularly its nightlife, as a major influence on her sound and lyrics.

=== Style ===
Girli's music makes use of samples from various sources including video games and news broadcasts.

Girli has stated that her songs are all autobiographical. Referring to her EP Ex Talk, Girli said, "I think this era of Girli, my style is definitely more influenced by '90s grunge and '70s punk, kind of mixed in together in a modern way."

=== Image ===
While performing in indie band Ask Martin as Milly Toomey in her mid-teens, Girli had short brown hair and wore men's clothing. As Girli, she has a distinctive visual aesthetic that includes neon pink dyed hair. Girli has observed a close link between her music and her fashion style. Describing her transition into a pink aesthetic, she said "I was really into indie, then I started listening to more female-made music, and my style developed based on what I was listening to." In a 2018 interview she described "wearing way more non-pink items of clothing, black, tartan and fishnet tights" when performing songs with a "more alternative and rockier sound". Girli has named Harajuku street fashion, the 1990s riot grrrl scene, and noughties girl bands as fashion influences.

Another core part of Girli's public persona is her feminist beliefs. Early interviews describe Girli throwing tampons into the crowd at gigs, which she said was a way of challenging the societal taboo around menstruation. Girli has expressed the view that music is a way to effect political change, in a way she views as more effective than parliamentary politics, which she became disillusioned with after her time as a Youth MP. She announced a partnership with Girls Against, an organisation campaigning against sexual harassment in live music venues, in 2016.

She took part in stylist Louby McLoughlin's project OKgrl, a fashion and music platform, in 2017, and Kirsti-Nicole Hadley's GRL PWR, a female-only arts collective.

== Personal life ==
Girli is openly bisexual/queer. She first came out as bisexual aged 15 at a Tegan and Sara concert. She also uses the word pansexual to describe herself.

Commenting on gender identity in a 2017 interview, she said: "Right now I identify as a woman, but what does that even mean? Is that what I say, who I am? Right now I feel like a woman, but that may change. Some days, I'm like 'fuck it, I don't feel like a woman or a man.'"

In a 2024 interview with the Big Issue she said: "The idea of women being with women is often overly romanticised, and even fetishised... I wanted to write about queer joy and queer sex, and how that is inherently rebellious... Queer women aren't just there for the male gaze."

She has stated that she has obsessive–compulsive disorder and takes antidepressants. Her single "Up & Down" is about her mental health struggles. She is a skateboarder.

== Discography ==
=== Albums ===
Title	Details	Peak chart positions	
Title	Details	UK	SCO
Odd One Out	Released: 5 April 2019; Label: PMR; Format: Digital download	—	—
Matriarchy	Released: 17 May 2024; Label: All Points/Believe UK; Format: CD, LP, Cassette, streaming, digital download	—	17
It's Just My Opinion	Released: 8 May 2026; Label: All Points/Believe UK; Format: CD, LP, cassette, streaming, digital download	80	16

=== Extended plays ===
Title	Details
Feel OK	Released: 19 May 2017; Label: Virgin EMI Records; Format: Digital download
Hot Mess	Released: 10 October 2017; Label: PMR Records; Format: Digital download
Ex Talk	Released: 12 February 2021; Label: Allpoints, Believe; Format: Digital download, streaming
Damsel in Distress	Released: 22 October 2021; Label: Allpoints, Believe; Format: Digital download, streaming
Why Am I Like This?	Released: 12 May 2023; Label: Allpoints, Believe; Format: Digital download, streaming

=== Singles ===
==== As lead artist ====
Title	Year	Album
"So You Think You Can Fuck with Me Do Ya"	2015	Non-album singles
"Girls Get Angry Too"	2016	Non-album singles
"Too Much Fun"	2016	Non-album singles
"It Was My Party"	2016	Non-album singles
"Girl I Met on the Internet"	2016	Non-album singles
"Fuck Right Back Off to LA"	2016	Non-album singles
"Not That Girl"	2017	Feel OK
"Feel OK" (featuring Lethal Bizzle)	2017	Feel OK
"Hot Mess"	2017	Hot Mess
"Mr. 10pm Bedtime" (solo or with The Tuts)	2017	Hot Mess
"Play It Cool"	2018	Non-album single
"Day Month Second"	2018	Odd One Out
"Young"	2018	Odd One Out
"Deal with It"	2019	Odd One Out
"Cold Feet" (with Rony Rex)	2020	Non-album singles
"Live the Weekend" (with Rizha)	2020	Non-album singles
"Big Cat" (with Brijs and P!nch)	2020	Non-album singles
"Has Been"	2020	Ex Talk
"Letter to My Ex"	2020	Ex Talk
"Passive Aggressive"	2021	Ex Talk
"More Than a Friend"	2021	Damsel in Distress
"Dysmorphia"	2021	Damsel in Distress
"Ricochet"	2021	Damsel in Distress
"Ruthless"	2021	Damsel in Distress
"I Really F**ked It Up"	2022	Why Am I Like This?
"Imposter Syndrome"	2023	Why Am I Like This?
"Cheap Love"	2023	Why Am I Like This?
"Inner Child"	2023	Why Am I Like This?
"Matriarchy"	2023	Matriarchy
"Nothing Hurts Like a Girl"	2023	Matriarchy
"Be with Me"	2024	Matriarchy
"Crush Me Up"	2024	Matriarchy
"Two Year Itch"	2024	Matriarchy
"Better Undressed"	2025	It's Just My Opinion
"Slap On The Wrist"	2026	It's Just My Opinion
"Romantic Sadness"	2026	It's Just My Opinion
"Squirm"	2026	It's Just My Opinion

==== As featured artist ====
Title	Year	Album
"Breaking My Phone" (Oscar Scheller featuring Girli)	2016	Non-album single
"Butterflies" (July Jones and Suzi Wu featuring Girli)	2021	Girls Can Do Anything
