= Klemen Slakonja =

Slovenian actor

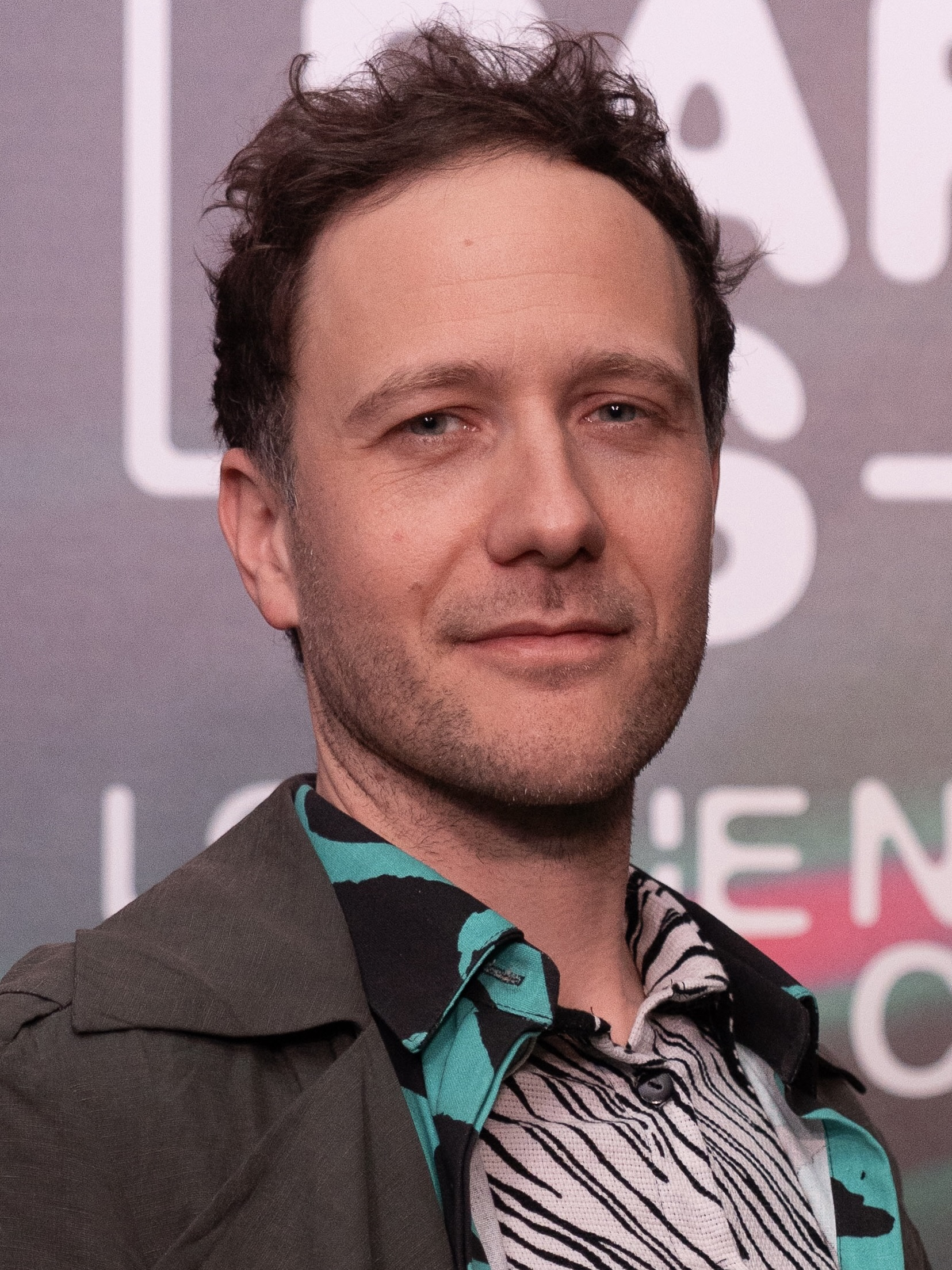
- Slakonja in 2025
- Born: 3 June 1985 (age 41); Brežice, SR Slovenia, SFR Yugoslavia
- Education: Academy of Theatre, Radio, Film and Television
- Occupations: Actor, singer, comedian, television host, impersonator, musician
- Years active: 2007–present
- Spouse: Mojca Fatur (2010)
- Children: 2

Klemen Slakonja (born 3 June 1985) is a Slovenian actor, singer, comedian, television host, and musician. He was employed at the Ljubljana Slovene National Theatre Drama and acting between 2010 to 2018. He represented Slovenia in the Eurovision Song Contest 2025 with the song "How Much Time Do We Have Left".

Slakonja studied at the Academy of Theatre, Radio, Film and Television. He is known in Slovenia for his comedy sketches, often made in the form of music videos, as well as for anchoring various shows such as the Slovenian national finals for the Eurovision Song Contest. He has made numerous impersonations of Slovenian musicians, Slovene philosopher Slavoj Žižek, Pope Francis, Vladimir Putin, Donald Trump, Angela Merkel and others.

== Career ==
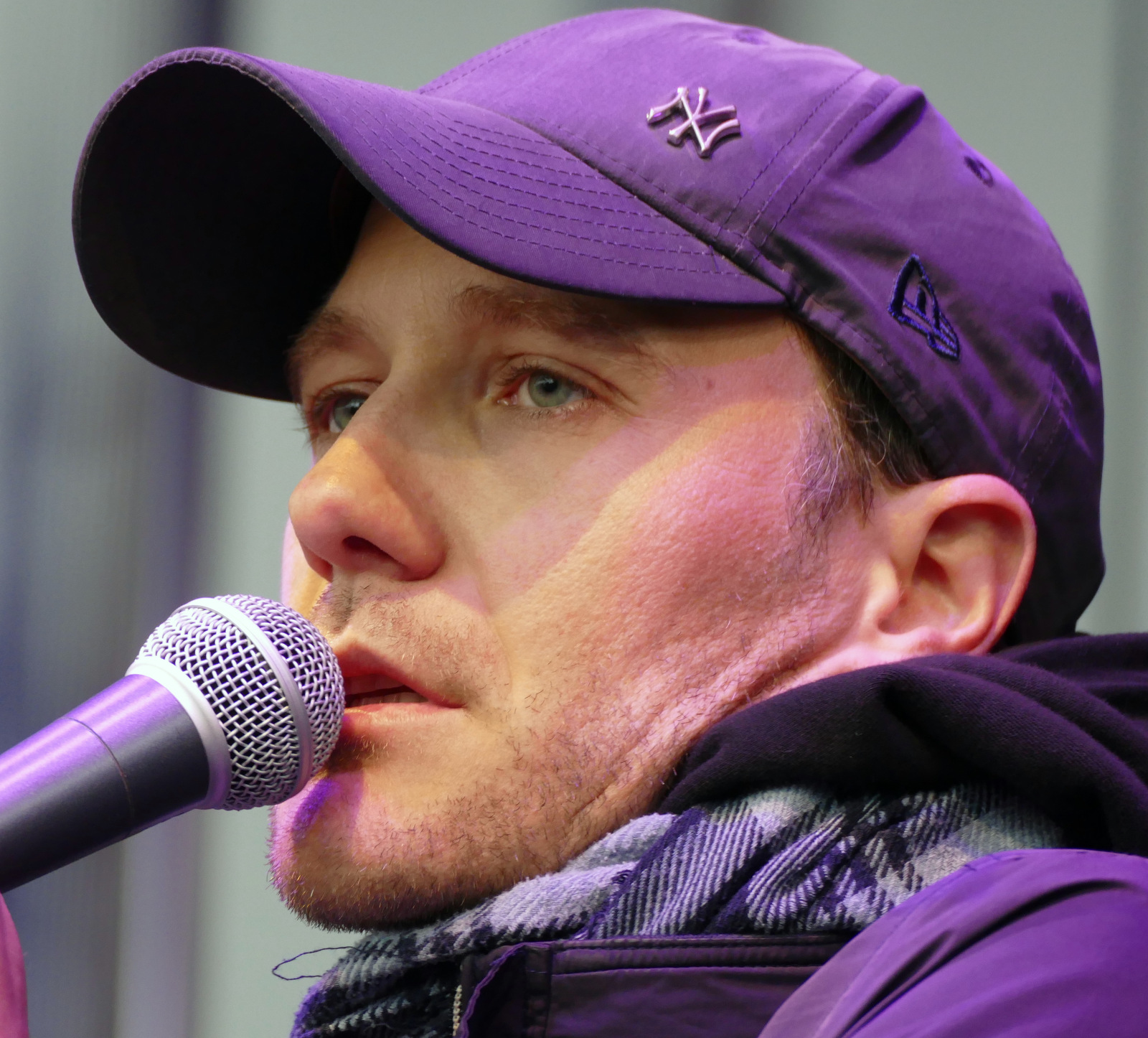
Slakonja in 2022

He was born in a Slovenian border town Brežice. His early impersonations started around second year of high school. He started his career at local Radio Energy near his home in the town of Krško, which is the most known for having the only nuclear powerplant in Slovenia. He was the radio anchor and he was hosting many different kind of local events.

=== 2007: Breakthrough after Radio Ga Ga show ===
In late summer of 2007, he hosted the home reception for Slovenian world class hammer throw champion Primož Kozmus in Brežice, to celebrate his silver medal from 2007 World Championships in Athletics in Osaka. To honour Primož Kozmus he translated the Slovenian Christmas song "Bela snežinka" to "Sivo kladivo" (Grey Hammer) and impersonated it with voices of various Slovenian popular musicians. That's when radio host Edi Štraus noticed him and recommended him to Sašo Hribar, satirical TV and radio host.

On 5 October 2007, Sašo Hribar invited Slakonja to make his first public performance on the national level to his satirical radio show called Radio Ga Ga where they are mocking mostly of out of Slovenian politicians and which is broadcast weekly on first channel of Slovenian National Radio. He imitated Slovenian ballad singer Rok Kosmač which was the breaking point of his career and after this performance suddenly became known to a wide Slovenian audience.

Just a month later in November 2007, he made the first public television appearance at satirical television show Hri-bar hosted by Sašo Hribar which was mocking animated characters, mostly Slovenian politicians. Show was broadcast on RTV Slovenia national television. Show hosted regular and also musical guests where Slakonja performed mocking Slovenian musicians with perfect voice and disguise impersonation.

=== 2008: Host on national TV ===
On 17 February 2008, he became a national television host taking over popular Sunday afternoon family show called "NLP" on RTV Slovenia. He became a co-host with Tjaša Železnik who previously run this show alone for about two years.

=== 2011: First time hosting EMA Festival ===
On 27 February 2011, he first time hosted EMA music festival competition, a Slovenian entry for Eurovision Song Contest 2011 and the winner was Maja Keuc. To honour this festival he wrote music and presented "16 let skomin", a mix song of all sixteen EMA festival winners; he also was spokesperson for Slovenia in the ESC Grand final. So far he was hosting this festival for three more times, in 2012, 2016 and 2020. In 2016 he presented "Putin, Putout" in the EMA show.

=== 2013: Zadetek v petek & Je bella cesta ===
On 15 February 2013, he hosted his first own comedy show "Zadetek v petek" (Full on Friday) which was broadcast on commercial TV3 Medias. The whole thing was shot in Belgrade, however the show was canceled only few months later after only one season. Shortly after he started hosting his second own comedy show "Je bella cesta" (Damn) which lasted for two seasons from October 2013 to May 2014.

=== 2015: Zadžuskaj hit song in commercial ===
He wrote "Zadžuskaj" (Juice it) song was released in 2014. He shot a music video in which he plays DeciDeci Klemzy, an awkward nerd character. Its jingle was used in a two commercials for health insurance company and became summer hit of the year 2015.

=== 2016: Putin, Putout and international fame ===
His comedy sketch "Putin, Putout" gained international popularity. This was the first video he shot as part of his TheMockingbirdMan project. The video parodies Russian president Vladimir Putin. Shortly after airing on Slovene television, the comedy sketch was uploaded to Slakonja's personal YouTube channel where it went viral.

His second TheMockingbirdMan project video entitled "Golden Dump (The Trump Hump)" impersonating Donald Trump premiered on 17 July 2016 at Siti Teater BTC Ljubljana. Two days later it was uploaded to Slakonja's personal YouTube channel. The third project was an imitation of Angela Merkel, the former German chancellor. The title of the song is "Ruf mich Angela".

=== 2025: Eurovision Song Contest ===
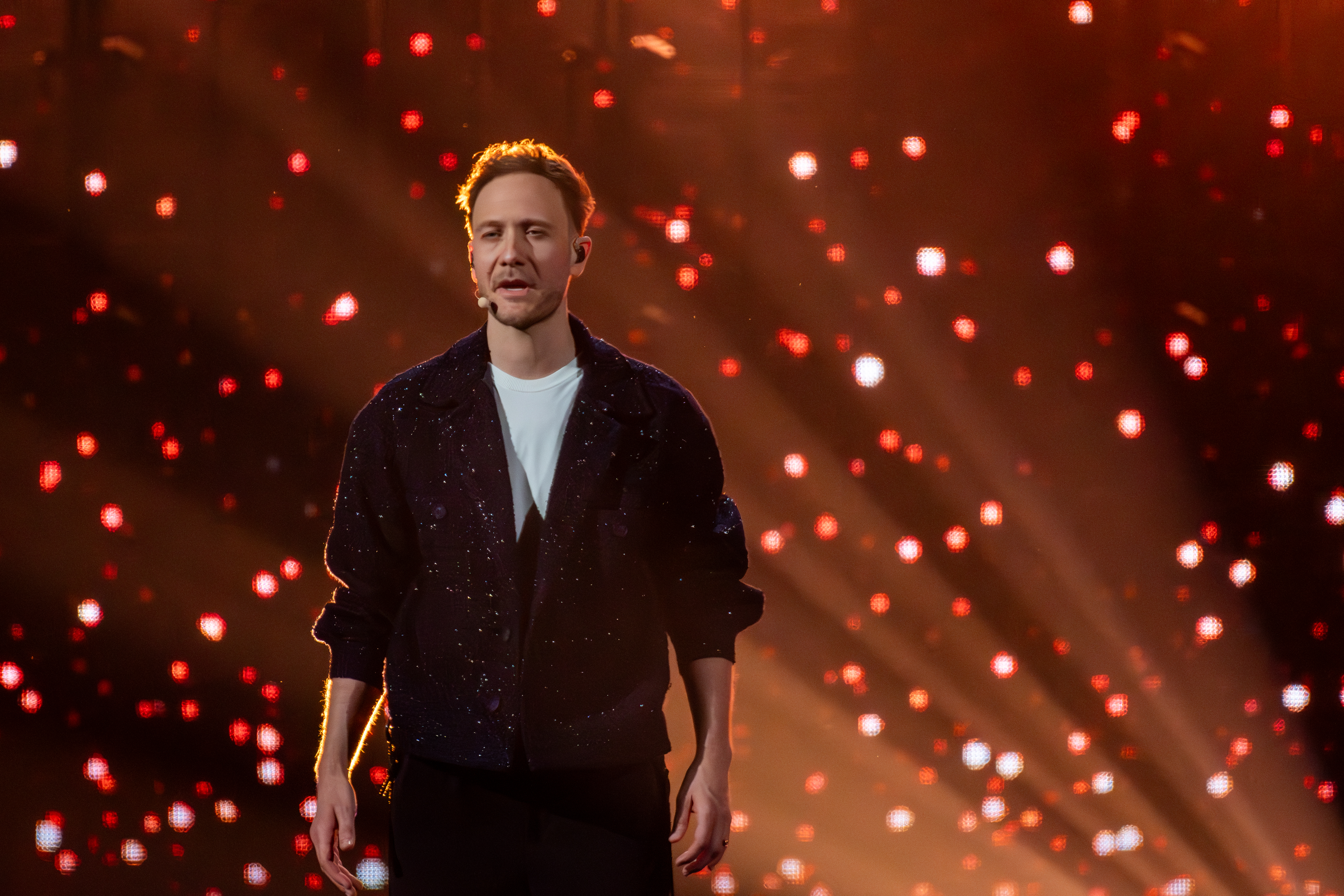
Klemen performing at Eurovision

In 2025, he was chosen to represent Slovenia in the Eurovision Song Contest 2025 with the song "How Much Time Do We Have Left" in Basel, Switzerland. Performing during the first semi-final on 13 May 2025, he failed to qualify to the grand final, finishing 13th in a field of 15 countries.

== Controversies ==
Shortly after winning EMA in 2025, Slakonja uploaded a video to his YouTube channel where he impersonates every Eurovision winner from 2000 to 2024, coming under fire after he darkened his skin for his Dave Benton impersonation. Benton defended Slakonja but Slakonja later removed the Dave Benton segment from the video and issued an apology.

== Work ==
=== Radio ===
Year		Role
2007	"Radio Energy" (Radio Krško)	host
2007	"Radio Ga Ga" (Radio Slovenia 1)	satire

=== Television ===
Year	Title	Role
2007	"Hri-bar"	satirical late show
2007	"Osa"	short film
2007	"Vučko"	short film
2008	"Nekega lepega popoldne" (NLP)	family show host
2009	"Palčica"	short film
2011	"EMA 2011"	Eurovision entry selection host
2012	"EMA 2012"	Eurovision entry selection host
2013	"Zadetek v petek"	comedy show host
2013	"Je bella cesta"	comedy show host
2014	"Cipercoper"	animation voice
2014	"Zadžuskaj s Klemzyem"	commercial
2016	"EMA 2016"	Eurovision entry selection host
2019	"Zadnji večer s Klemnom Slakonjo"	comedy show host
2020	"EMA 2020"	Eurovision entry selection host
2024	"Kdo si ti? Zvezde pod masko"	comedy show host

=== Film ===
Year	Title	Role
2009	"Osebna prtljaga"	Vid

=== Web series ===
Year	Title	Role
2010	"Dan ljubezni"	YouTube series (protective brother)

=== List of parodies ===
Year	Title of parody	Impersonating	Role	Video
2007	"Hepatitis B"	(Slovenia) Anžej Dežan	singer	YouTube
2007	"Urška"	(Slovenia) Jan Plestenjak	singer	YouTube
2007	"S.O.L.I.S."	(Slovenia) Tomi Meglič	singer	YouTube
2007	"You always dreamt about Njega"	(Slovenia) Fredi Miler	singer	YouTube
2007	"Čakam te"	(Slovenia) Rok Kosmač	singer	YouTube
2007	"S Katancem v JAR"	(Slovenia) Vlado Kreslin	singer	YouTube
2007	"Hamburger in marmelada"	(Slovenia) Rok Ferengja	singer	YouTube
2008	"Da veš"	(Slovenia) Alya	singer	YouTube
2008	"Oda radosti"	(Slovenia) Damjan Murko	singer	YouTube
2008	"Nor sem"	(Slovenia) Dennis ex. Game over	singer	YouTube
2011	"Twelve"	(Republic of Ireland) Bono	singer	YouTube
2011	"You're beautiful"	(England) James Blunt	singer	YouTube
2011	"Zero"	(Spain) Enrique Iglesias	singer	YouTube
2011	"It ain't over 'til it's over"	(United States) Lenny Kravitz	singer	YouTube
2011	"Marío"	(Puerto Rico) Ricky Martin	singer	YouTube
2011	"Left Outside Alone"	(United States) Anastacia	singer	YouTube
2011	"Viva la Corrida"	(England) Chris Martin	singer	YouTube
2011	"Jodl Jodl (This time for Slovenija)"	(Colombia) Shakira	singer	YouTube
2011	"Sex Bomb"	(Wales) Tom Jones	singer	YouTube
2011	"Bed of roses"	(United States) Jon Bon Jovi	singer	YouTube
2011	"Shape of a chicken"	(England) Sting	singer	YouTube
2012	"Mi fa schifo questa vita"	(Italy) Eros Ramazzotti (United States) Tina Turner	singer	YouTube
2012	"Slovenia Will Win" (Eurovision Song Contest)	One Man Band Aid (Republic of Ireland) Bono (England) Sting (England) James Blunt (England) Elton John (England) Chris Martin (Austria) Vienna Boys' Choir (Canada) Justin Bieber (United States) Lenny Kravitz (United States) Gospel choir (United States) Lady Gaga	singers	YouTube
2013	"Slash" interview	(England) / (United States) Slash	musician	YouTube
2013	"Polka Gangnam Style"	(South Korea) Psy	singer	YouTube
2013	"JJ Style"	(Slovenia) Janez Janša	politician	YouTube
2013	"Ti moja rožica"	(Slovenia) Modrijani	band	YouTube
2013	"Cooking with Bojan Emeršič"	(England) Jamie Oliver	cooking	YouTube
2013	"Najlepše otroške pesmice"	(Slovenia) Eroika	vocal trio	YouTube
2013	"Nočem biti papež"	(Slovenia) Franc Rode	cardinal	YouTube
2013	"Proposing to Hannah Mancini"	(United States) Hugh Hefner	Playboy	YouTube
2013	"Jasna Kuljaj"	(United States) Gregory House	actor	YouTube
2013	"Holivud hils"	(Bosnia and Herzegovina) Branko Đurić	actor	YouTube
2013	"Penzioner"	(Belgium) / (Slovenia) Karl Erjavec	politician	YouTube
2013	"Dejan Zavec vs Chuck Norris"	(United States) Chuck Norris	actor	YouTube
2013	"Aplavz"	(United States) Lady Gaga	singer	YouTube
2013	"The Perverted Dance (Cut the Balls)"	(Slovenia) Slavoj Žižek	philosopher	YouTube
2013	"La Mia Strada È La Mia Decisione"	(Italy) Andrea Massi	skiing	YouTube
2013	"Zdaj prihajam in zdaj grem"	(Slovenia) Magnifico	musician	YouTube
2013	"Modern Pope"	(Vatican City) / (Argentina) Pope Francis	pope	YouTube
2014	"Gromska strela"	(Slovenia) Modrijani	band	YouTube
2014	"Dragon, Dragone"	(Slovenia) Goran Dragić	basketball	YouTube
2014	"Delam vse, kar dela Pahor"	(Slovenia) Borut Pahor	politician	YouTube
2014	"Na veliko noč"	(Slovenia) Soul Greg Artist	musician	YouTube
2014	"Put me zove"	(Bosnia and Herzegovina) Halid Bešlić	musician	YouTube
2014	"Sad je tu sve EU"	(Croatia) Oliver Dragojević	musician	YouTube
2014	"Zgoraj brez"	(Slovenia) Tanja Žagar	musician	YouTube
2020	Slovenia’s 25 years in the Eurovision Song Contest	(Slovenia) Winners of Ema	musicians	YouTube
2025	All Eurovision Winners (2000–2025) The Ultimate Eurovision Challenge by Klemen Slakonja	Eurovision Winners	musicians	YouTube

== TheMockingbirdMan project ==
A project where he is impersonating and making fun of world leaders.

No.	Title	Impersonating	Director	Premiere	Release date	Video
1	"Modern Pope"	(Vatican City) (Argentina) Pope Francis	Miha Knific	Pop	8 November 2013	YouTube
2	"Putin, Putout"	(Russia) Vladimir Putin	Miha Knific	RTV Slovenia Studio 1 (EMA 2016)	27 February 2016	YouTube
3	"Golden Dump (The Trump Hump)"	(United States) Donald Trump	Miha Knific	Siti Teater BTC Ljubljana	17 July 2016	YouTube
4	"Ruf mich Angela"	(Germany) Angela Merkel	Miha Knific		3 July 2017	YouTube

== Awards and nominations ==
Year	Award	Category	Nominee(s)	Result	Ref.
2025	Eurovision Awards	Miss Congeniality	Himself	Nominated	

Awards and achievements
Preceded by Raiven with "Veronika"	Slovenia in the Eurovision Song Contest; 2025	Succeeded by Incumbent
