= Last Pizza Slice =

Slovenian band

LPS
- Origin: Celje, Slovenia
- Genres: Pop; rock
- Years active: 2018–present
- Members: Filip Vidušin; Zala Velenšek; Žiga Žvižej; Martin Mutec; Gašper Hlupič
- Past members: Mark Semeja

LPS is a Slovenian pop-rock band. They represented Slovenia in the Eurovision Song Contest 2022 with the song "Disko".

== Career ==
The band was formed in December 2018 in the music room of Gimnazija Celje-Center.

They released their first single "Silence in my Head" in February 2022.

=== 2022: Eurovision Song Contest ===
The Slovenian public broadcaster Radiotelevizija Slovenija (RTVSLO) announced on 26 November 2021 that LPS had been selected as one of 24 entrants to have a chance to represent Slovenia in the Eurovision Song Contest 2022. LPS also won in the final, and as a result, represented Slovenia in the Eurovision Song Contest 2022 with "Disko".

=== 2023-present ===
On 13 January 2023, the band released "Osem Korakov" with the accompanying music video.

On 16 July 2023, the band announced via social media that guitarist Mark Semeja had parted ways, to "continue on separate musical journeys".

On 20 September 2023, they released "Insomnia" with the accompanying music video.

On 5 February 2024, they announced the coming of their debut album with the single "Počakaj me". The album was released with the same name on 28 February 2024 and it was created in collaboration with widely known Slovenian producer Žare Pak.

== Members ==
=== Current members ===
- Filip Vidušin – vocals (2019–present)
- Gašper Hlupič – drums (2019–present)
- Zala Velenšek – bass guitar (2021–present)
- Žiga Žvižej – electronic keyboard (2018–present)
- Martin Mutec - electric guitar (2023–present)

=== Former Members ===
- Mark Semeja – electric guitar (2021–2023)

== Discography ==
=== Singles ===
Title	Year	Peak chart positions	Album or EP
Title	Year	LTU	Album or EP
"Silence in My Head"	2022	—	Non-album singles
"Disko"	2022	35	Non-album singles
"Osem korakov"	2023	—	Počakaj me
"Insomnia"	2023	—	Počakaj me
"Počakaj me"	2024	—	Počakaj me
"Perry"	2025	—	Non-album single
"—" denotes a recording that did not chart or was not released in that territory.

Awards and achievements
Preceded by Ana Soklič with "Amen"	Slovenia in the Eurovision Song Contest; 2022	Succeeded by Joker Out with "Carpe Diem"
