= Lorella Flego =

Slovenian television presenter

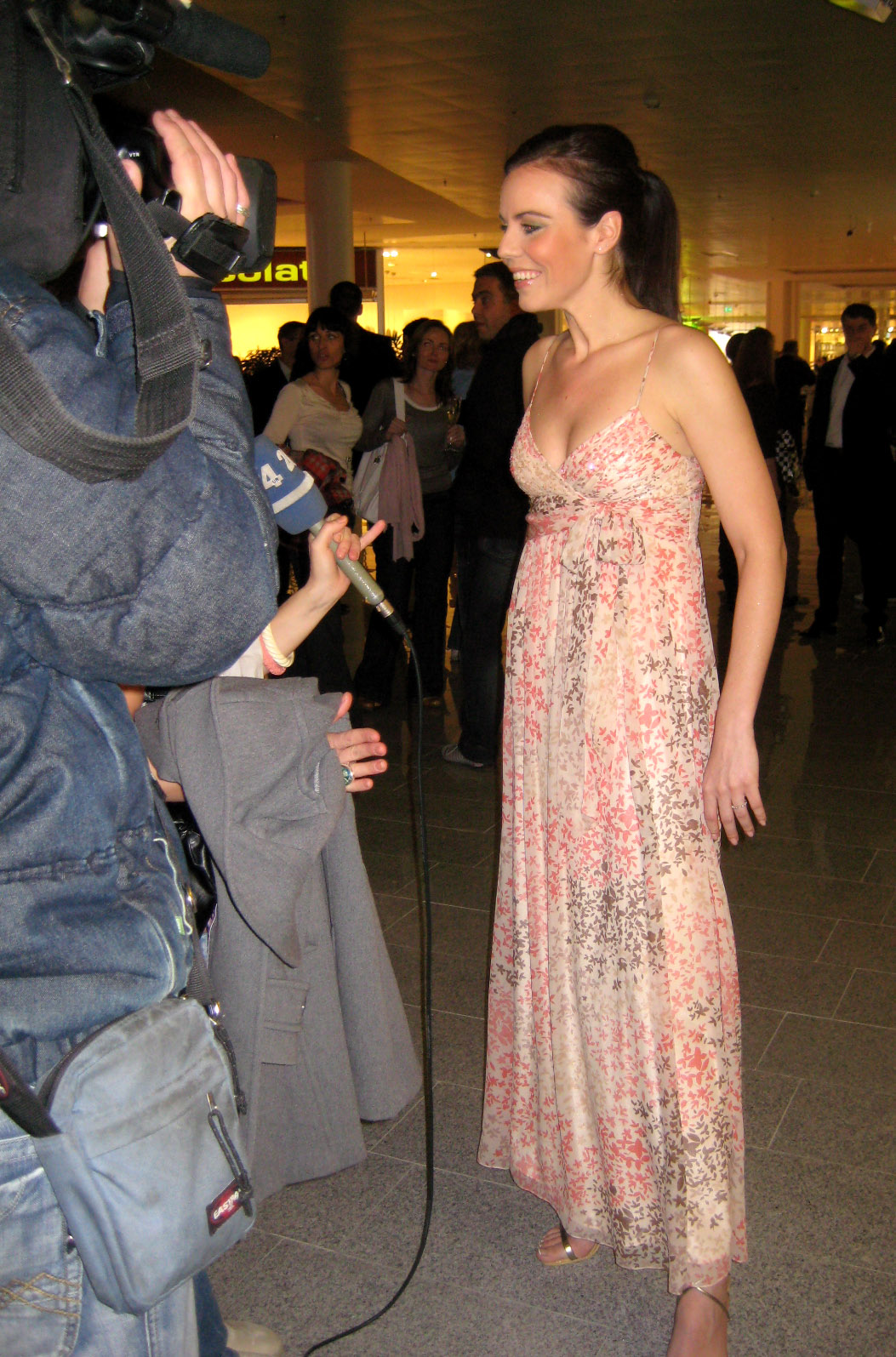
Lorella Flego

Lorella Flego (born 3 July 1974 in Koper) is a Slovenian television presenter. She has presented several national selections for the Eurovision Song Contest for her country and was the spokesperson for Slovenia in the final of the Eurovision Song Contest 2012, 2021, 2022, 2024 and 2025.

Born into an Italian-speaking family, her mother is Italian writer Isabella Flego. She spent the first years of her childhood in Africa, and the majority of her life in Koper. Her brother is TV presenter Andrea F. She has one daughter.
