= Slovenia in the Eurovision Song Contest 2020 =

- Eurovision Song Contest 2020
- Participating broadcaster: Radiotelevizija Slovenija (RTVSLO)
- Country: Slovenia
- Selection process: Evrovizijska Melodija 2020
- Selection date: 22 February 2020

Competing entry
- Song: "Voda"
- Artist: Ana Soklič
- Songwriters: Ana Soklič; Bojan Simončič

Placement
- Final result: Contest cancelled

Participation chronology

Slovenia was set to be represented at the Eurovision Song Contest 2020 with the song "Voda" written by Ana Soklič and Bojan Simončič, and performed by Soklič herself. The Slovene participating broadcaster, Radiotelevizija Slovenija (RTVSLO), organised the national final Evrovizijska Melodija 2020 in order to select its entry for the contest. 18 entries competed in the first stage of the national final, EMA FREŠ 2020, from which two entries qualified to compete in EMA 2020 following a two-month-long competition. Twelve entries competed in EMA 2020 where the winner was selected over two rounds of voting. In the first round, the top two entries were selected by a three-member jury panel. In the second round, "Voda" performed by Ana Soklič was selected as the winner entirely by a public vote.

Slovenia was drawn to compete in the first semi-final of the Eurovision Song Contest which took place on 12 May 2020. However, the contest was cancelled due to the COVID-19 pandemic.

== Background ==
Prior to the 2020 contest, Radiotelevizija Slovenija (RTVSLO) had participated in the Eurovision Song Contest representing Slovenia twenty-five times since its first entry in 1993. Its highest placing in the contest, to this point, has been seventh place, achieved on two occasions: in 1995 with the song "Prisluhni mi" performed by Darja Švajger and in 2001 with the song "Energy" performed by Nuša Derenda. The country's only other top ten result was achieved in 1997 when Tanja Ribič performing "Zbudi se" placed tenth. Since the introduction of semi-finals to the format of the contest in 2004, Slovenia had thus far only managed to qualify to the final on six occasions. In 2019, "Sebi" performed by Zala Kralj and Gašper Šantl qualified to the final and placed fifteenth.

As part of its duties as participating broadcaster, RTVSLO organises the selection of its entry in the Eurovision Song Contest and broadcasts the event in the country. The broadcaster confirmed its participation in the 2020 contest on 1 August 2019. RTVSLO has traditionally selected its entry through a national final entitled Evrovizijska Melodija (EMA), which has been produced with variable formats. To this point, the broadcaster has only foregone the use of this national final in 2013 when the entry was internally selected. For 2020, the broadcaster opted to organise Evrovizijska Melodija 2020 (EMA 2020) to select the entry and launched the newly created associated competition EMA FREŠ that acted as a preselector for EMA itself.

== Before Eurovision ==
=== EMA FREŠ 2020 ===
EMA FREŠ 2020 was the first phase of the national final format Evrovizijska Melodija (EMA) used by RTV Slovenija to select Slovenia's entry for the Eurovision Song Contest 2020. The final of the competition was broadcast on TV SLO 1 and online via the broadcaster's RTV 4D platform.

==== Format ====
Eighteen songs competed over three stages between 4 November 2019 and 18 January 2020. The eighteen songs competed in nine daily duels in the first stage with three duels per week. In each week, online voting held between Monday and Wednesday selected the duel winners to proceed to a weekly final, while the remaining entries proceeded to the second stage. In each weekly final, an expert jury and online voting selecting two of the three songs to proceed to the final. The online vote selected the first finalist and the jury selected the other finalist, while the remaining entry proceeded to the second stage. The second stage was a Second Chance round where the remaining twelve songs competed in six daily duels with three duels per week. The same process of the first stage was applied which resulted in the elimination of eight songs. The third stage was the final, during which a three-member expert jury and public televoting selected two of the ten songs to proceed to EMA 2020. The televote selected the first qualifier and the jury selected the other qualifier.

==== Competing entries ====
Artists and composers were able to submit their entries to the broadcaster between 1 August 2019 and 19 September 2019. All artists were required to be under the age of 26 and have three or less commercially released songs. An expert committee consisting of Maja Pinterič (social media influencer), Rebeka Tomc (social media influencer), Denis Živcec (journalist and Eurovision expert), Klemen Kopina (television presenter) and Bojan Cvjetićanin (singer-songwriter) selected eighteen artists and songs for the competition from the received submissions. The competing artists were announced on 21 October 2019.

Artist	Song	Songwriter(s)
Alfirev	"Črno bela lika"	Patrik Šimenc, Žan Vončina, Tia Alfirev
Astrid in Avantgarden	"Sing to Me"	Astrid Ana Kljun, Janez Hace, Martin Štibernik
Klarity	"Diham"	Klara Klasinc Brglez, Primož Jurendić, Niki Kozoderc
Lana Hrvatin	"Dream"	Lana Hrvatin, Enej Žagar
Ljudmila Frelih	"Vztrajaj, ker je vredno"	Jean Markič, Domn Grace
Marko Škof	"Hočem da je vse kot prej"	Domen Kumer, Mirna Reynolds
Marmoris	"Moj pristan"	Matic Skok, Blaž Horvat, Andraž Kos
Martina	"Pleši"	Martina
Nuša Pliberšek	"Življenje je čarovnija"	Nuša Pliberšek
Parvani Violet	"Cupid"	Veronika Steiner, Anže Zaveršnik, Aljaž Šumej, Florjan Ajdnik, Jaka Jeršič, Anže Lečnik
Petra Ceglar	"Srce naglas"	Petra Ceglar
Pia Nina	"Tukaj in zdaj"	Pia Nina Stružnik Štefe, Jernej Kržič
Sara Petešič	"Sanjaj/Dream"	Sara Petešič
Saška	"Še kar lovim tvoj nasmeh"	Jure Skaza, Matic Mlakar
Soulution	"Eno"	Patrik Mrak, Nace Jordan, Žiga Bahor
Stella	"Ne vem, če sem v redu"	Špela Jezovšek
Tilen Lotrič	"Jaz in ti"	Tilen Lotrič
Younite	"The Cure"	Jakob Zlatinšek, Pija Lucija Kralj

==== Duels ====
The duels stage of EMA FREŠ 2020 took place over three weeks between 4 and 22 November 2019, hosted by Bojan Cvjetićanin, who would later go on to represent Slovenia in the Eurovision Song Contest 2023 as lead singer of Joker Out, Klemen Kopina, Denis Živčec, Maja Pinterič and Rebeka Tomc. In each week a daily online vote selected one of the two competing entries in each of the three duels to proceed to the weekly final. The remaining three entries proceeded to the Second Chance round. In each weekly final, the three entries first faced an online vote where the winner proceeded directly to the final of EMA FREŠ 2020. An additional qualifier was then selected out of the remaining two entries by a jury panel.

Public vote qualifier Jury qualifier

Daily Duels 1 – 4–6 November 2019
Duel	Date	Artist	Song	Votes	Result	Ref.
I	4 November 2019	Stella	"Ne vem, če sem v redu"	869	Weekly final	
I	4 November 2019	Pia Nina	"Tukaj in zdaj"	800	Second Chance	
II	5 November 2019	Soulution	"Eno"	1,136	Second Chance	
II	5 November 2019	Younite	"The Cure"	1,150	Weekly final	
III	6 November 2019	Astrid in Avantgarden	"Sing to Me"	811	Second Chance	
III	6 November 2019	Martina	"Pleši"	1,126	Weekly final	

Weekly Final 1 – 8 November 2019
Artist	Song	Jury	Online		Place	Result
Artist	Song	Jury	Votes	Points	Place	Result
Stella	"Ne vem, če sem v redu"	2	669	2	2	Final
Younite	"The Cure"	1	1,148	1	1	Final
Martina	"Pleši"	3	558	3	3	Second Chance

Daily Duels 2 – 11–13 November 2019
Duel	Date	Artist	Song	Votes	Result	Ref.
I	11 November 2019	Klarity	"Diham"	1,098	Weekly final	
I	11 November 2019	Tilen Lotrič	"Jaz in ti"	829	Second Chance	
II	12 November 2019	Marko Škof	"Hočem da je vse kot prej"	688	Second Chance	
II	12 November 2019	Petra Ceglar	"Srce naglas"	965	Weekly final	
III	13 November 2019	Parvani Violet	"Cupid"	1,008	Weekly final	
III	13 November 2019	Sara Petešič	"Sanjaj/Dream"	347	Second Chance	

Weekly Final 2 – 15 November 2019
Artist	Song	Jury	Online		Place	Result
Artist	Song	Jury	Votes	Points	Place	Result
Klarity	"Diham"	3	799	1	2	Final
Petra Ceglar	"Srce naglas"	2	617	3	3	Second Chance
Parvani Violet	"Cupid"	1	766	2	1	Final

Daily Duels 3 – 18–20 November 2019
Duel	Date	Artist	Song	Votes	Result	Ref.
I	18 November 2019	Saška	"Še kar lovim tvoj nasmeh"	1,240	Weekly final	
I	18 November 2019	Ljudmila Frelih	"Vztrajaj, ker je vredno"	279	Second Chance	
II	19 November 2019	Nuša Pliberšek	"Življenje je čarovnija"	688	Weekly final	
II	19 November 2019	Alfirev	"Črno bela lika"	831	Second Chance	
III	20 November 2019	Marmoris	"Moj pristan"	723	Weekly final	
III	20 November 2019	Lana Hrvatin	"Dream"	554	Second Chance	

Weekly Final 3 – 22 November 2019
Artist	Song	Jury	Online		Place	Result
Artist	Song	Jury	Votes	Points	Place	Result
Saška	"Še kar lovim tvoj nasmeh"	1	773	1	1	Final
Nuša Pliberšek	"Življenje je čarovnija"	3	516	3	3	Second Chance
Marmoris	"Moj pristan"	2	679	2	2	Final

==== Second Chance ====
The Second Chance round of EMA FREŠ 2020 took place over three weeks between 25 November and 6 December 2019, hosted by Bojan Cvjetićanin, Klemen Kopina, Denis Živčec, Maja Pinterič and Rebeka Tomc. In each week a daily online vote selected one of the two competing entries in each of the three duels to proceed directly to the weekly final. The remaining three entries proceeded to the Second Chance round. In each weekly final, the three entries first faced an online vote where the winner proceeded to the final of EMA FREŠ 2020. An additional qualifier was then selected out of the remaining two entries by a jury panel.

Public vote qualifier Jury qualifier

Daily Duels 4 – 25–27 November 2019
Duel	Date	Artist	Song	Votes	Result	Ref.
I	25 November 2019	Pia Nina	"Tukaj in zdaj"	429	Weekly final	
I	25 November 2019	Sara Petešič	"Sanjaj/Dream"	158	Eliminated	
II	26 November 2019	Marko Škof	"Hočem da je vse kot prej"	277	Eliminated	
II	26 November 2019	Nuša Pliberšek	"Življenje je čarovnija"	307	Weekly final	
III	27 November 2019	Alfirev	"Črno bela lika"	1,050	Weekly final	
III	27 November 2019	Soulution	"Eno"	863	Eliminated	

Weekly Final 4 – 29 November 2019
Artist	Song	Jury	Online		Place	Result
Artist	Song	Jury	Votes	Points	Place	Result
Pia Nina	"Tukaj in zdaj"	1	337	2	2	Final
Nuša Pliberšek	"Življenje je čarovnija"	3	260	3	3	Eliminated
Alfirev	"Črno bela lika"	2	934	1	1	Final

Daily Duels 5 – 2–4 December 2019
Duel	Date	Artist	Song	Votes	Result	Ref.
I	2 December 2019	Lana Hrvatin	"Dream"	324	Weekly final	
I	2 December 2019	Martina	"Pleši"	165	Eliminated	
II	3 December 2019	Astrid in Avantgarden	"Sing to Me"	808	Weekly final	
II	3 December 2019	Petra Ceglar	"Srce naglas"	649	Eliminated	
III	4 December 2019	Ljudmila Frelih	"Vztrajaj, ker je vredno"	240	Eliminated	
III	4 December 2019	Tilen Lotrič	"Jaz in ti"	270	Weekly final	

Weekly Final 5 – 6 December 2019
Artist	Song	Jury	Online		Place	Result
Artist	Song	Jury	Votes	Points	Place	Result
Lana Hrvatin	"Dream"	2	326	2	2	Final
Astrid in Avantgarden	"Sing to Me"	1	398	1	1	Final
Tilen Lotrič	"Jaz in ti"	3	261	3	3	Eliminated

==== Final ====
The final of EMA FREŠ 2020 took place on 18 January 2020 at the RTV Slovenija Studio 2 in Ljubljana, hosted by Maja Pinterič and Bojan Cvjetićanin. In addition to the performances of the competing entries, Fed Horses, Lumberjack and Raiven performed as guests. Two entries qualified to EMA 2020. The ten competing entries first faced a public vote where the winning song proceeded. An additional qualifier was then selected out of the remaining nine entries by a three-member jury panel. The jury consisted of Urša Mihevc (singer-songwriter and member of Fed Horses), Rok Ahačevčič (singer-songwriter and member of Lumberjack) and Jernej Vene (music editor for Radio Val 202).

Jury qualifier Public vote qualifier

Final – 18 January 2020
R/O	Artist	Song	Jury	Televote		Result
R/O	Artist	Song	Jury	Votes	Rank	Result
1	Stella	"Ne vem, če sem v redu"	9	588	2	Eliminated
2	Younite	"The Cure"	4	417	7	Eliminated
3	Alfirev	"Črno bela lika"	6	461	6	Eliminated
4	Klarity	"Diham"	8	474	4	Eliminated
5	Marmoris	"Moj pristan"	10	464	5	Eliminated
6	Saška	"Še kar lovim tvoj nasmeh"	5	684	1	Advanced
7	Pia Nina	"Tukaj in zdaj"	3	154	10	Eliminated
8	Lana Hrvatin	"Dream"	7	211	9	Eliminated
9	Parvani Violet	"Cupid"	1	570	3	Advanced
10	Astrid in Avantgarden	"Sing to Me"	2	285	8	Eliminated

=== EMA 2020 ===
EMA 2020 was the 24th edition of the Slovenian national final format Evrovizijska Melodija (EMA). The competition was used by RTV Slovenija as the second phase of the national final to select Slovenia's entry for the Eurovision Song Contest 2020 and was broadcast on TV SLO 1 and online via the broadcaster's RTV 4D platform.

==== Competing entries ====
Artists and composers were able to submit their entries to the broadcaster between 1 August 2019 and 19 November 2019. 74 entries were received by the broadcaster during the submission period. An expert committee consisting of Raiven (musician and singer), Mojca Menart (head of the publishing business of ZKP RTV SLO) and Jernej Vene (music editor for Radio Val 202) selected ten artists and songs for the competition from the received submissions. The competing artists were announced on 20 December 2019. Among the competing artists were former Slovenian Eurovision contestant Tinkara Kovač who represented Slovenia in 2014 and former Slovenian Junior Eurovision contestant Lina Kuduzović who represented Slovenia in Junior Eurovision 2015. Božidar Wolfand – Wolf represented Yugoslavia in Eurovision 1984 as a backing vocalist.

In 2020, it emerged that the Serbian pop star Jelena Karleuša had applied to EMA in 2020, but was not on the list of selected participants. At the end of 2020, she confirmed that she "had received an invitiation from Slovenian organizers to represent Slovenia at Eurovision 2020", and that she prepared the song "La bomba" featuring Pabllo Vittar for the occasion, but that it didn't sound the way she had intended. In 2023, she reconfirmed this, stating that the Spanish-English-Slovenian languaged song was written for Eurovision, but that she withdrew it due to "technical issues". Pabllo hasn't commented on these claims. "La bomba" was released on 20 August 2023, without Pabllo making an appearance in the song.

==== Final ====
EMA 2020 took place on 22 February 2020 at the RTV Slovenija Studio 1 in Ljubljana, hosted by Klemen Slakonja. In addition to the performances of the competing entries, 2019 Slovenian Eurovision entrants zalagasper performed as guests. An online backstage broadcast at RTV Slovenija's official website also occurred concurrently with the competition, which was hosted by Boštjan Gorenc, Anže Tomić and Eva Košak. The winner was selected over two rounds of voting. In the first round, a three-member jury panel selected two entries to proceed to the second round. The jury consisted of Maja Keuc (singer and 2011 Slovenian Eurovision entrant), Darja Švajger (singer, vocal coach and 1995 and 1999 Slovenian Eurovision entrant) and Nuša Derenda (singer and 2001 Slovenian Eurovision entrant). In the second round, a public vote selected "Voda" performed by Ana Soklič as the winner.

Final – 22 February 2020
R/O	Artist	Song	Songwriter(s)	Place
1	Simon Vadnjal	"Nisi sam"	Kevin Koradin, Clifford Goilo, Simon Vadnjal	4
2	Saška	"Še kar lovim tvoj nasmeh"	Jure Skaza, Matic Mlakar	4
3	Gaja Prestor	"Verjamem vase"	Žan Serčič, Gaja Prestor	7
4	Ana Soklič	"Voda"	Ana Soklič, Bojan Simončič	1
5	Inmate	"The Salt"	Andrej Bezjak, Marko Duplišak, Miha Oblišar, Jure Grudnik	7
6	Manca Berlec	"Večnost"	Patrik Šimenc, Manca Berlec	10
7	Tinkara Kovač	"Forever"	Aleš Klinar, Anja Rupel	4
8	Božidar Wolfand – Wolf	"Maybe Someday"	Grigor Koprov, Božidar Wolfand – Wolf, Helena Banič Wolfand	12
9	Parvani Violet	"Cupid"	Veronika Steiner, Anže Zaveršnik, Aljaž Šumej, Florjan Ajdnik, Jaka Jeršič, Anže Lečnik	3
10	Klara Jazbec	"Stop the World"	Ed Fisher, Ani Cordero, Klara Jazbec	7
11	Imset	"Femme Fatale"	Jaka Peterka, Dejan Macura, Blaž Horvat, Jaka Ažman, Matej Pečaver, Rok Lunaček	11
12	Lina Kuduzović	"Man Like U"	Lina Kuduzović	2

Superfinal – 22 February 2020
R/O	Artist	Song	Televote	Place
1	Ana Soklič	"Voda"	5,035	1
2	Lina Kuduzović	"Man Like U"	4,369	2

== At Eurovision ==
According to Eurovision rules, all nations with the exceptions of the host country and the "Big Five" (France, Germany, Italy, Spain and the United Kingdom) are required to qualify from one of two semi-finals in order to compete for the final; the top ten countries from each semi-final progress to the final. The European Broadcasting Union (EBU) split up the competing countries into six different pots based on voting patterns from previous contests, with countries with favourable voting histories put into the same pot. On 28 January 2020, a special allocation draw was held which placed each country into one of the two semi-finals, as well as which half of the show they would perform in. Slovenia was placed into the first semi-final, to be held on 12 May 2020, and was scheduled to perform in the first half of the show. However, due to the COVID-19 pandemic, the contest was cancelled.

Prior to the Eurovision Song Celebration YouTube broadcast in place of the semi-finals, it was revealed that Slovenia was set to perform in position 5, following the entry from North Macedonia and before the entry from Lithuania.
