= Ana Soklič =

Slovenian singer and songwriter (born 1984)

- Soklič in 2024

Background information
- Also known as: Anna Soklich; Diona Dim
- Born: 10 April 1984 (age 42)
- Origin: Savica, Slovenia
- Genres: Pop; soul; Jazz
- Occupations: Singer; songwriter
- Years active: 2004–present
- Label: ZKP RTV Slovenija
- Website: anasoklic.com

Ana Soklič (born 10 April 1984), also known as Anna Soklich, is a Slovenian singer and songwriter. She won EMA 2020 with "Voda" and was due to represent Slovenia at the Eurovision Song Contest 2020 before it was cancelled; she represented Slovenia at the Eurovision Song Contest 2021 with the song "Amen", placing 13th in the first semi-final with 44 points.

== Early life and career ==
Soklič comes from Savica in the Upper Carniola region. She studied singing with Darja Švajger and in 2018 continued her training in Atlanta, United States.

She began her career under the stage name Diona Dim (also Diona Dimm), competing in EMA 2004 with "If You" and in EMA 2007 with "Oče" as Diona Dimm Team, as well as at Slovenska popevka in 2004 and 2005. In 2012 she took part in the only season of X Faktor, where she was eliminated in a sing-off against Alma Merklin in the fifth live show.

In the following years she performed mainly jazz and soul repertoire, including with the Big Band RTV Slovenija. In 2014, while working mostly in Italy, she gave a solo concert in Venice with Big Band DOM. In December 2018 she performed a solo concert in Zagreb with the HRT Jazz Orchestra conducted by Miron Hauser at the Gorgona Hall of the Museum of Contemporary Art, broadcast by HR3 and HTV3.

At Slovenska popevka 2019 she performed "Temni svet" (music and lyrics by Matevž Šalehar, a.k.a. Hamo, arranged by Žiga Pirnat) and received the expert jury's grand prize for best song as well as the award for best interpretation.

== Eurovision Song Contest ==
On 20 December 2019 Soklič was announced as one of the twelve participants in EMA 2020 with the song "Voda", which she co-wrote with Bojan Simončič and Žiga Pirnat. On 22 February 2020 she won the contest and was to represent Slovenia at the Eurovision Song Contest 2020 in Rotterdam. The contest was cancelled on 18 March 2020 due to the COVID-19 pandemic. On 16 May 2020 RTV Slovenija announced that Soklič would represent Slovenia at the Eurovision Song Contest 2021. Her song "Amen", with music by Soklič, Simončič and Pirnat and lyrics by Soklič and Charlie Mason, was presented on 27 February 2021. In the first semi-final on 18 May 2021 she placed 13th with 44 points (36 from the juries and 8 from the televote) and did not qualify for the final. In April 2021 she recorded an a cappella version of "Amen" with Perpetuum Jazzile for the I Feel Slovenia campaign.

== Later career ==
In June 2020 she sang "Tu je moj dom", arranged by Žiga Pirnat, at the national Statehood Day ceremony in Ljubljana, and in 2021 TV Slovenija dedicated the portrait programme Skozi leta to her. She performed in Monaco in 2019 and in October 2021, the latter at a masked ball at the Hôtel de Paris Monte-Carlo attended by Prince Albert II, and in November 2021 at an event in Brussels marking the end of the Slovenian Presidency of the Council of the EU. In 2021 the Municipality of Bohinj gave her an award for special achievements.

In 2023 she self-released the single "Bohinian Girl, Bohemian Woman", co-written with Bojan Simončič; British producer Troy Miller mixed the track and played drums, piano and organ, and the backing vocalists included Dorian and Nayanna Holley. The single "Savica" followed in November 2024; she premiered it at the Bled Strategic Forum 2024 with an orchestra conducted by Žiga Pirnat.

Since 2024 she has performed with the band Soul Cast. In 2025 she released the songs "Prešeren", "Oboje" and "Ameria" with Peter Ugrin and Soul Cast, recorded live at the Emporia flower shop in Ljubljana. With the band she has given concerts at venues including Rajhenburg Castle and the Jazz Kamp Kranj festival.

== Discography ==
=== Extended plays ===
- Voda (ZKP RTV Slovenija, 2020)
- Born to the Fight (ZKP RTV Slovenija, 2021)
- Savica (self-released, 2024)
- Emporia (with Soul Cast; self-released, 2025)

=== Singles ===
- "If You" (2004)
- "Cosmo" (2004)
- "Oče (Father)" (2007)
- "Naj Muzika Igra" (2013)
- "Temni Svet" (2019)
- "Voda" (2020)
- "Amen" (2021)
- "Bohinian Girl, Bohemian Woman" (2023)
- "Savica" (2024)
- "Prešeren", "Oboje", "Ameria" (2025, with Peter Ugrin and Soul Cast)

== Awards ==
- 2019: Slovenska popevka – expert jury grand prize for best song and award for best interpretation ("Temni svet")
- 2020: Winner of EMA ("Voda")
- 2021: Award of the Municipality of Bohinj for special achievements

Awards and achievements
Preceded by Zala Kralj & Gašper Šantl with "Sebi"	Slovenia in the Eurovision Song Contest; 2020 (cancelled)	Succeeded by Herself with "Amen"
Preceded by Herself with "Voda"	Slovenia at the Eurovision Song Contest; 2021	Succeeded by LPS with "Disko"
