= Slovenia in the Eurovision Song Contest =

- Eurovision Song Contest
- Participating broadcaster: Radiotelevizija Slovenija (RTVSLO; 1993–2025)

Participation summary
- Appearances: 30 (17 finals)
- First appearance: 1993
- Last appearance: 2025
- Highest placement: 7th: 1995, 2001
- Participation history: 1993; 1994; 1995; 1996; 1997; 1998; 1999; 2000; 2001; 2002; 2003; 2004; 2005; 2006; 2007; 2008; 2009; 2010; 2011; 2012; 2013; 2014; 2015; 2016; 2017; 2018; 2019; ~~2020~~; 2021; 2022; 2023; 2024; 2025; 2026
- Slovenia's page at Eurovision.com
- For the most recent participation see Slovenia in the Eurovision Song Contest 2025

Slovenia has been represented at the Eurovision Song Contest 30 times since its debut in 1993, having hosted a qualification round (Kvalifikacija za Millstreet) in Ljubljana for seven countries due to the influx of new nations wishing to join the contest. The Slovenian participating broadcaster in the contest is Radiotelevizija Slovenija (RTVSLO).

Slovenia's best result is seventh position achieved on two occasions; in 1995 with "Prisluhni mi" performed by Darja Švajger and in 2001 with "Energy" by Nuša Derenda. Since the introduction of the semi-finals in 2004, Slovenia has qualified for the final on eight occasions. As of 2025, Slovenia has not made it to the top ten since their seventh place finish in 2001, only making it to the thirteenth position in 2002 and 2011. Having only missed two contests from 1993 to 2025, RTVSLO opted not to participate in 2026 due to the inclusion of Israel in the context of the Gaza war.

== Participation ==
Radiotelevizija Slovenija (RTVSLO) is a full member of the European Broadcasting Union (EBU) since 1 January 1993, thus eligible to participate in the Eurovision Song Contest since then. It has participated in the contest representing Slovenia since its 38th edition that same year.

Before its independence in 1991, Slovenia was part of Yugoslavia. Six Yugoslavian entrants in the Eurovision Song Contest came from the former SR Slovenia (1961, 1962, 1966, 1967, 1970, and 1975). The contest was broadcast in the socialist republic by the Yugoslav Radio Television's (JRT) affiliate RTV Ljubljana.

== History ==
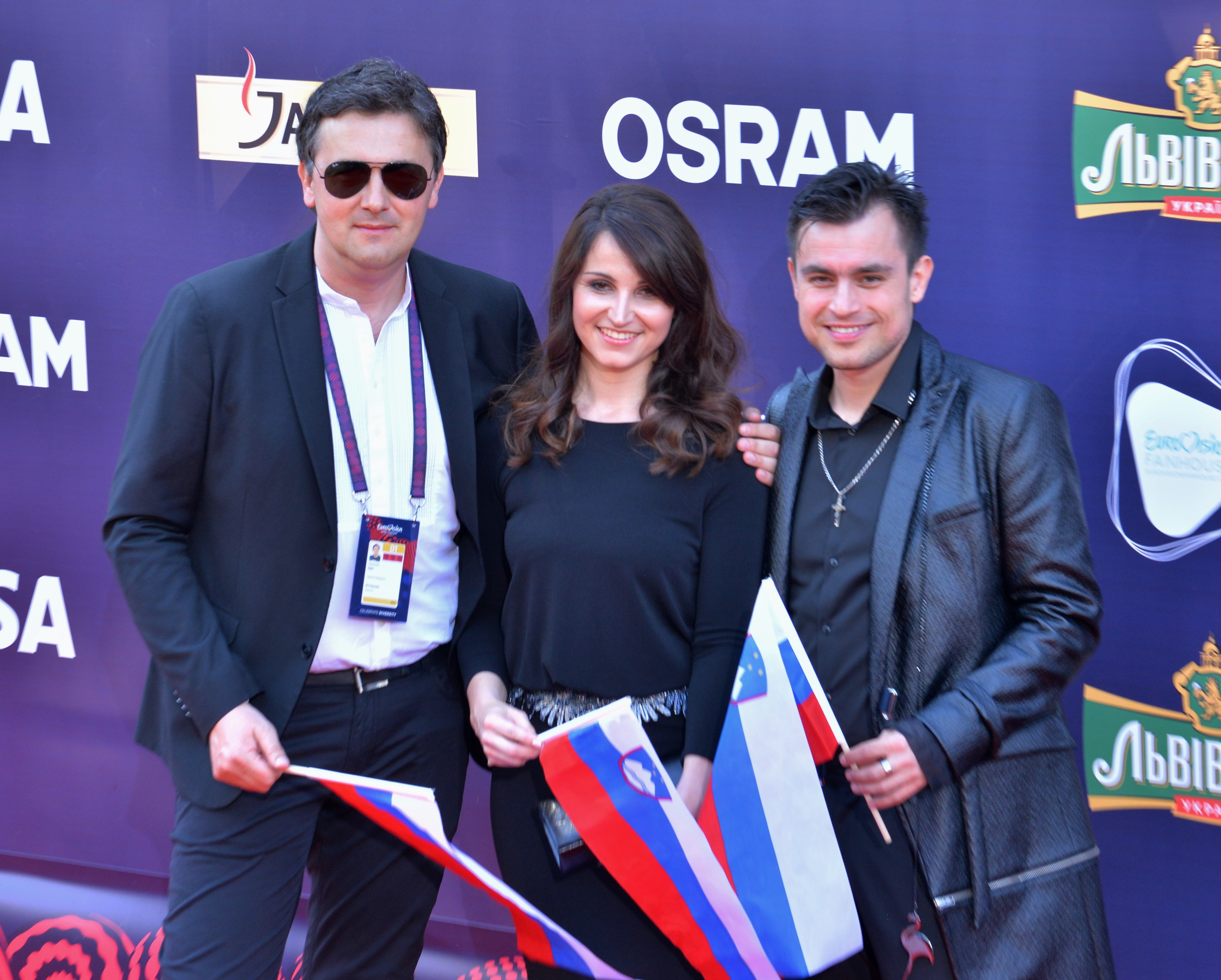
Omar Naber (pictured) has represented Slovenia on two occasions, in both 2005 and 2017, failing to qualify both times with "Stop" and "On My Way".

=== Early participation ===
After the fall of Communism across Europe in the early 1990s and the Dissolution of Yugoslavia, newly independent Slovenia was one of seven countries that had emerged from the Eastern Bloc wishing to join the Eurovision Song Contest. Due to the influx of new countries wishing to participate, the EBU introduced a pre-qualifying round for countries that had either never participated in the contest at all, or in the case of former republics of Yugoslavia, had not previously competed as nations in their own right. This was, however, merely a 'sticking-plaster' measure that was plainly not a sustainable solution for future years, as it would not be seen as remotely equitable. But in the meantime, Croatia, Bosnia and Herzegovina, Hungary, Slovakia, Romania, Estonia, and Slovenia were left to battle it out in a qualification round. The EBU selected RTVSLO to host the event in Ljubljana. Held on 3 April 1993 at the RTVSLO studios, Slovenia was one of three countries to qualify, finishing in first place with "Tih deževen dan" performed by 1X Band. The band were previously selected to represent Slovenia through RTVSLO's national selection Slovenski izbor za Pesem Evrovizije 1993.

Slovenia's debut at Eurovision fared reasonably poorly finishing in a mere 22nd place with just 9 points. Due to the poor result, Slovenia was relegated from the 1994 contest and had to wait until 1995 to enter again. For their return in 1995, RTVSLO organised the same national selection process as 1993 to determine their entry. Slovenski izbor za Pesem Evrovizije 1995 resulted in the selection of Darja Švajger with "Prisluhni mi". Švajger achieved Slovenia's best result to date at the contest, reaching an impressive seventh place including ten points from Greece and the United Kingdom. In 1996, RTVSLO introduced its long-running national final Evrovizijska Melodija (EMA). This selection process was used every year until the country was relegated for a second time in 2000 due to a poor average score. Slovenia returned in 2001, using the EMA format again. 2001 marked the second time Slovenia achieved seventh place with Nuša Derenda and "Energy". This remains the country's most recent top ten result to date.

=== 2004–2010 ===
In 2004, the EBU introduced a semi-final round in order to control the number of countries entering the contest every year. Due to not placing in the top ten the previous year, Slovenia was forced to compete in the semi-final round for the 2004 contest. After winning the national final EMA 2004, the country was represented by the duo Platin with the song "Stay Forever". The performance proved to be disastrous with Slovenia only receiving five points placing 21st out of 22, hence failing to qualify for the final. The following two years also saw Slovenia absent from the Eurovision final, with Omar Naber and Anžej Dežan both failing to qualify for the final. By 2007, Slovenia was one of only five countries that had not made an appearance in the final since 2003. EMA 2007 resulted in the victory of Alenka Gotar with her operatic pop song "Cvet z juga". This became the first ever Slovene entry to qualify for the Eurovision final, placing seventh in the semi-final with 140 points. In Slovenia's first Eurovision final appearance since 2003, Alenka Gotar reached a respectable fifteenth place with 66 points. In the three following years, Rebeka Dremelj, Quartissimo feat. Martina Majerle and Ansambel Žlindra and Kalamari all failed to qualify for the final, with the latter only receiving six points in the 2010 semi-final.

=== 2010s ===
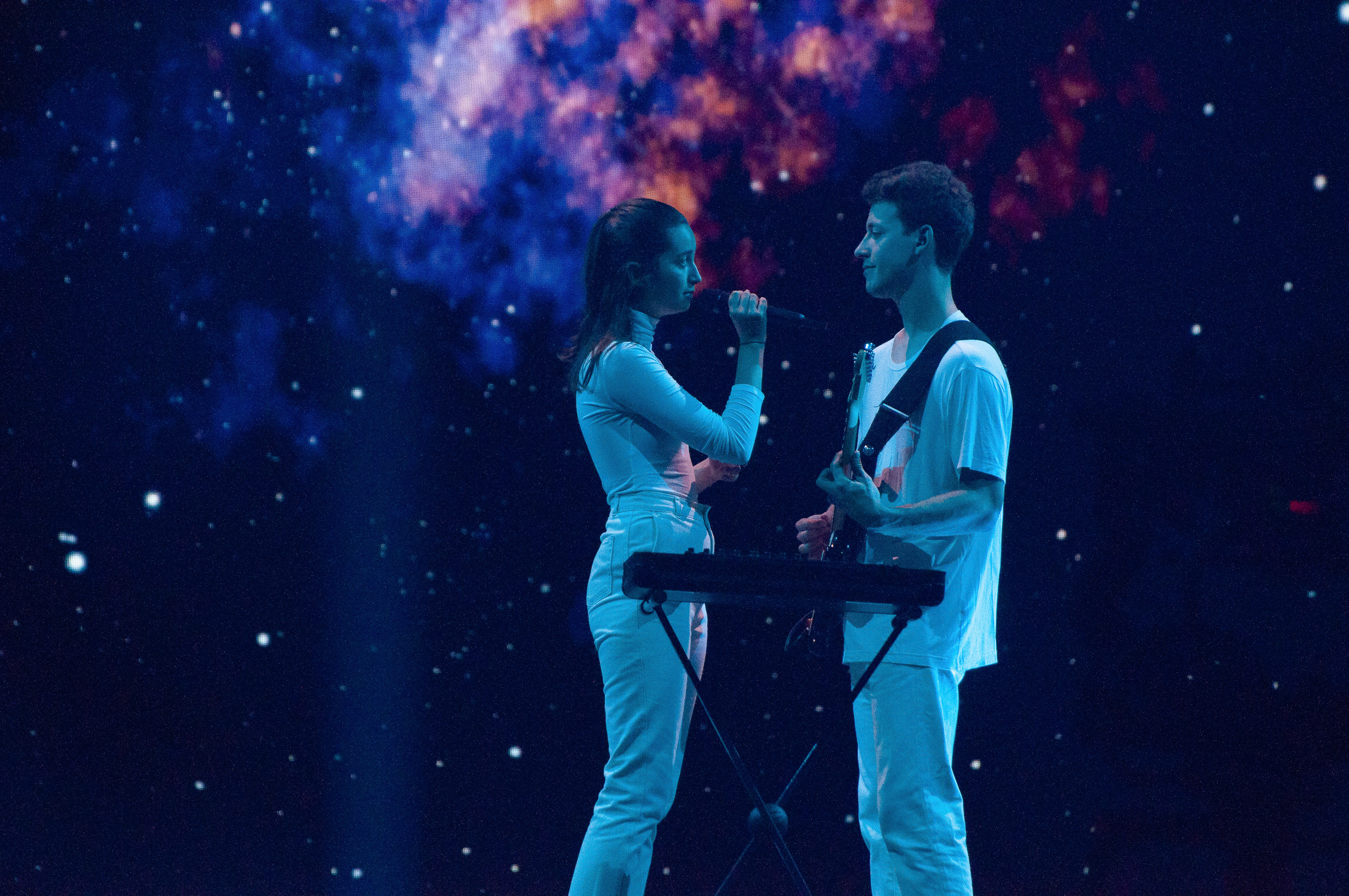
Zala Kralj and Gašper Šantl became the highest scoring Slovene entrants at the 2019 contest in Tel Aviv, securing 105 points in the final.

2011 saw a change in Slovenia's luck at the Eurovision Song Contest, qualifying for the final for the first time since 2007. Following her victory at the Slovene national final EMA 2011, Maja Keuc represented the nation with "No One". Participating in the second semi-final, Maja fared extremely well, placing first with the juries with 146 points and seventh in the public televote with 68 points. This meant that Slovenia qualified to the final in an impressive third place. In the final, Maja achieved the country's best result since 2002, placing thirteenth with 96 points. It was later revealed that the juries placed Slovenia in fourth place with 160 points, while the public placed the entry 22nd with 39 points. Maja's song remains a fan favourite today, with the Slovenian public voting it as the nation's best ever Eurovision entry in a 2020 poll.

Due to the success in 2011, RTVSLO introduced a large scale national final for the 2012 contest in Baku, Azerbaijan. Misija Evrovizija was a five month long selection process that took place between August 2011 and January 2012, which resulted in the selection of two singers to advance to Misija EMA 2012 (phase two of the selection). Ultimately, Eva Boto was selected to represent the country with "Verjamem". Boto failed to qualify for the final, finishing in 17th place only ahead of Slovakia. RTVSLO confirmed Slovenia's participation in the 2013 Eurovision Song Contest on 15 December 2012 after speculation that a withdrawal was being considered. The Slovenian entry for the Eurovision Song Contest has traditionally been selected through EMA, which has been produced with variable formats. For 2013, the broadcaster opted to forego the use of this national final in order to internally select the Slovenian entry due to time constraints and reduced funding. RTVSLO selected Slovene-American singer Hannah Mancini with "Straight into Love". The entry finished in last place in the first semi-final with just 8 points, marking the first time that Slovenia has finished in last place in a Eurovision event.

For 2014, RTVSLO confirmed that they would organise EMA 2014 after being the last country to confirm participation despite more speculations over a potential withdrawal. The winner of the eighteenth edition of EMA was Tinkara Kovač with "Round and Round". Kovač reached the final marking Slovenia's first final appearance since 2011. The country finished in 25th place with 9 points (8 from Montenegro and 1 from Macedonia). For the 2015 contest, Slovenia was represented by Maraaya with "Here for You". The duo qualified for the final in 5th place, including twelve points from Azerbaijan and Montenegro. In the final, Slovenia finished in 14th position with 39 points - the country's best result since 2011. Following the contest, "Here for You" went on to enter the 'Top 50 Charts' in Slovenia, Austria, Slovakia, Finland and Belgium.

For the following two years, Slovenia was absent from the final with ManuElla and Omar Naber failing to qualify. However, in both 2018 and 2019 Slovenia qualified for the final twice in a row once again. Lea Sirk reached 22nd with "Hvala, ne!" and Zala Kralj & Gašper Šantl achieved fifteenth place with 105 points - the most points ever scored by Slovenia in a Eurovision final.

=== 2020s ===
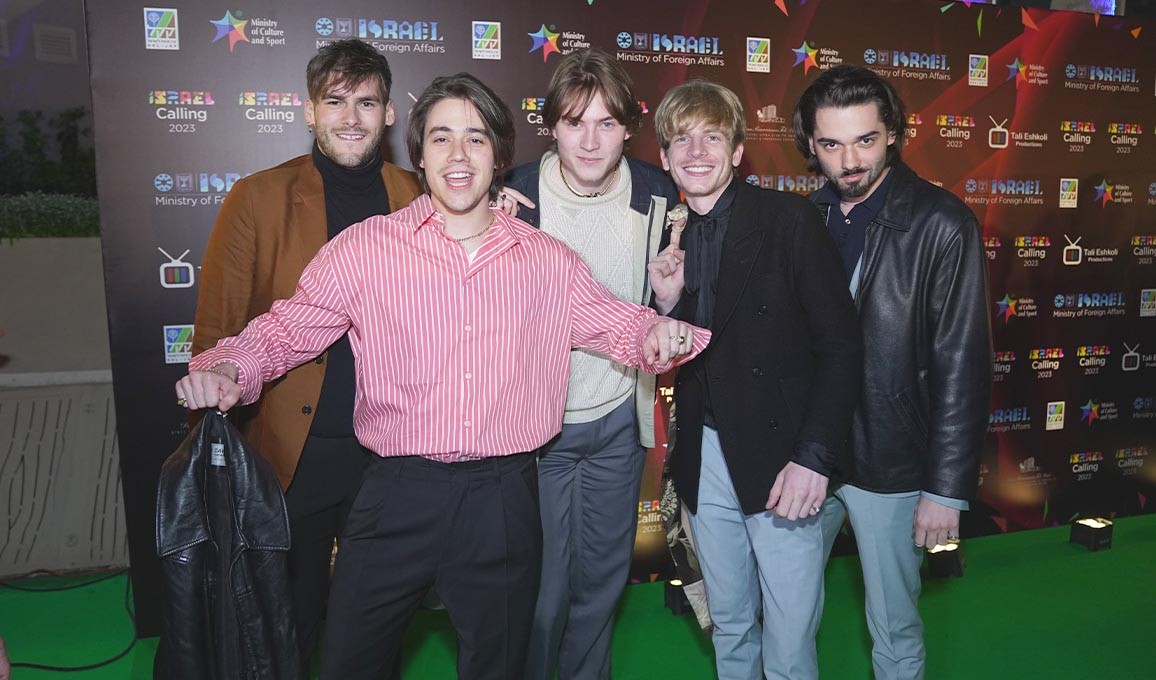
Joker Out, one of the biggest bands in Slovenia, were only the third artists to be internally selected by RTVSLO to represent Slovenia in the 2023 contest in Liverpool.

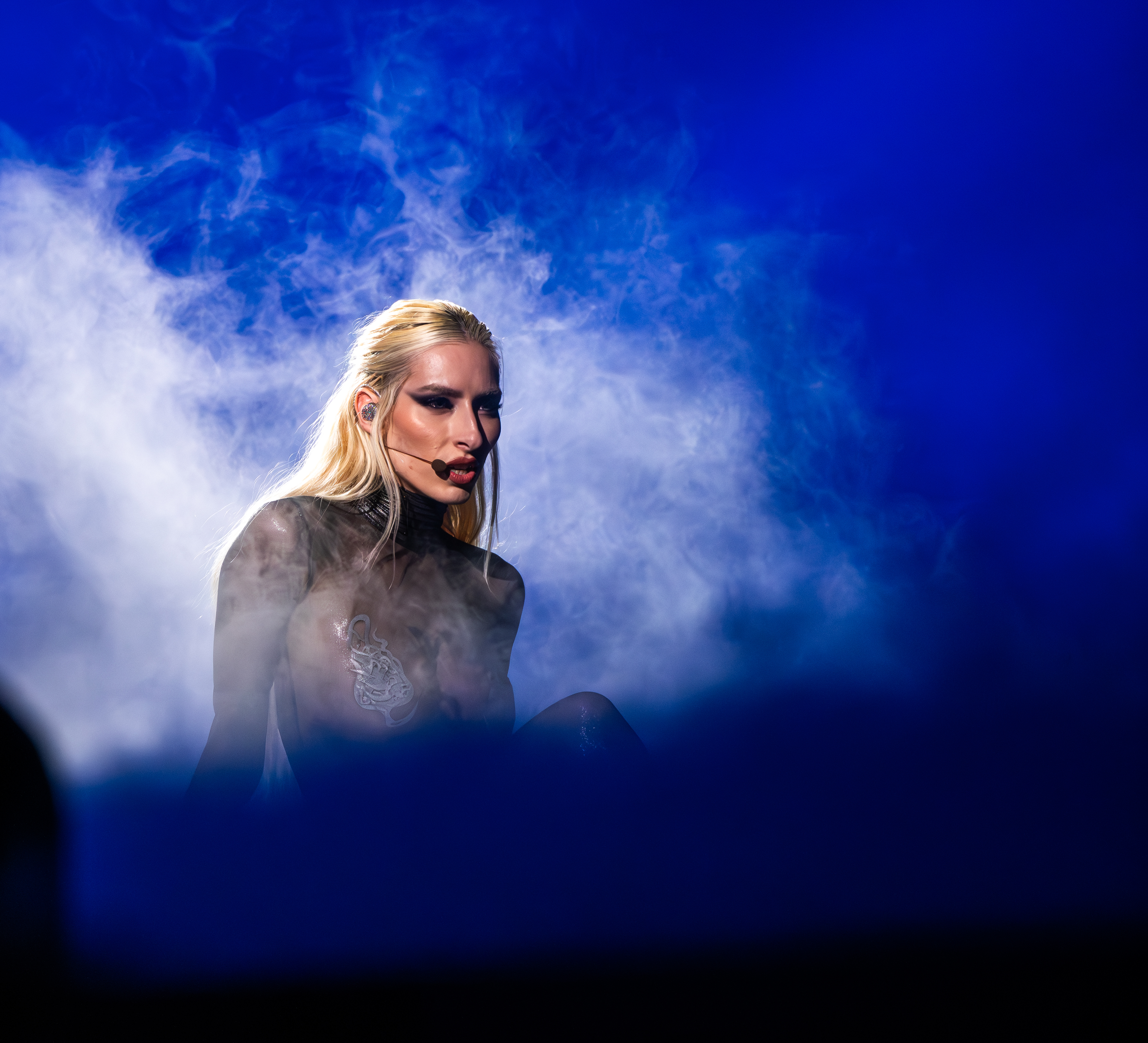
Raiven, who represented Slovenia in 2024, is the most recent Slovene entrant to qualify for the final.

The successful result in 2019 provoked RTVSLO to expand their national final format. In 2020, EMA FREŠ was introduced as a pre-selection for the main EMA competition. The selection gives new and upcoming Slovenian artists a chance to promote themselves and fight for a place in EMA. Having won EMA 2020, Ana Soklič was due to represent Slovenia in the Eurovision Song Contest 2020 with "Voda". However, after the contest was cancelled due to the COVID-19 pandemic, RTVSLO internally selected her to represent Slovenia in 2021 with "Amen". She failed to qualify for the final, finishing in 13th place with 44 points.

On 8 October 2021, RTVSLO confirmed that both EMA FREŠ and EMA would return for the Slovenian selection for the Eurovision Song Contest 2022, with a revamped format from the first edition. On 19 February 2022, after a three month long process, it was determined that LPS would represent Slovenia at the Eurovision Song Contest 2022 in Turin, Italy. At the contest, LPS finished last with 15 points and failed to qualify from the first semi-final, lengthening Slovenia's absence from the final. It was later revealed that the band finished last in their semi-final, marking Slovenia's worst result at the contest in ten years.

Following the poor result in 2022, RTVSLO considered withdrawing from the Eurovision Song Contest in 2023. However, after discussions with the Music Commission of the Programme Council, the broadcaster opted against a withdrawal, and confirmed its participation in the 2023 contest, held in Liverpool, on 15 September 2022. After the poor result in 2022, RTVSLO decided to change both the selection format for the Slovenian entry, deciding to internally choose their act for only the third time and introducing Maša Kljun as the country's new head of delegation. On 8 December 2022, RTVSLO revealed that they had selected Joker Out to represent Slovenia in Liverpool, with their song "Carpe Diem" released on 4 February 2023, during a special presentation show 'Misija Liverpool' that celebrated 30 years of Slovenian participation in the Eurovision Song Contest. At the contest, Slovenia qualified for the final for the first time since 2019, finishing in fifth place in the second semi-final with 103 points. In the final, Slovenia placed 21st with 78 points, securing twelve points from both Serbia and Croatia in the jury vote and televote respectively.

Following the highest viewing figures for the contest recorded by RTVSLO since 2015, the broadcaster confirmed Slovenia's participation in the 2024 contest on 14 September 2023, later announcing that a brand new national final Misija Malmö ("Mission Malmö") would be introduced as their selection method for the contest; however, the broadcaster ultimately cancelled the format, opting for an internal selection. Raiven was ultimately selected and represented Slovenia in 2024 with the song "Veronika". She qualified for the final, marking a second consecutive qualification for the country, ultimately placing twenty-third in the final, with twenty of her twenty-seven points all coming from Croatia. On 9 March 2024, Mario Galunič, editor at RTVSLO, drafted a document envisaging a plan to return selecting the Slovene entries for the contest through the national final EMA from 2025 until 2028. EMA 2025 took place on 1 February 2025, with Klemen selected to represent Slovenia at the 2025 contest in Basel with the song "How Much Time Do We Have Left?", who ultimately failed to qualify at the 2025 contest in Basel with a thirteenth place finish in the first semi-final.

==== Withdrawal ====
On 26 May 2025, RTVSLO stated that it would reconsider its participation in the contest if the EBU did not respond adequately to concerns surrounding the "transparency of the vote", referring to Israel's televote win in 2025. In early September 2025, Evrovizija.com reported that general director of RTV SLO Ksenija Horvat is not satisfied with the EBU's handling of the controversies surrounding the 2024 and 2025 contests. She stated that the broadcaster's questions were "more or less ignored" and added that "we clearly won't be going to the Eurovision Song Contest". The following day, RTVSLO stated that it would decide whether to participate in the 2026 contest after the EBU makes a decision on Israel's future participation and address concerns surrounding the "transparency of the vote" in December, adding that it would not participate if Israel is allowed to compete. Following the 95th General Assembly of the EBU on 4 December 2025, RTVSLO confirmed that it would not participate in the 2026 contest in Vienna, adding that it would not broadcast any of the shows on its channels. This marked Slovenia's first absence since 2000 and the first time in Slovenia's history as an independent country without a live broadcast of the contest.

On 22 September 2026, RTVSLO confirmed it was considering its participation in the 2027 contest in Burgas. The broadcaster stated that participation depended upon its adopted Programme and Production Plan for 2027, adding that its financial capacities remained a significant limitation and that it would hold talks with the EBU. Slovenia ultimately did not appear on the provisional list of participating nations announced by the EBU on 28 October 2026. However, the EBU specifically noted that it had given both RTVSLO and RTVE, the Spanish national broadcaster, an extension to determine participation until December 2026 in recognition of "complex" circumstances.

== Participation overview ==
Prior to Yugoslavia's dissolution, artists from the Slovene federal unit represented Yugoslavia in 1961, 1962, 1966, 1967, 1970, and 1975.

Table key
1	First place
3	Third place
◁	Last place
◇	Entry selected but did not compete

Year	Artist	Song	Language	Final	Points	Semi	Points
1993	1X Band	"Tih deževen dan"	Slovene	22	9	1 (Note: Progressed through Kvalifikacija za Millstreet)	54
1995	Darja Švajger	"Prisluhni mi"	Slovene	7	84	No semi-finals	
1996	Regina	"Dan najlepših sanj"	Slovene	21	16	19	30
1997	Tanja Ribič	"Zbudi se"	Slovene	10	60	No semi-finals	
1998	Vili Resnik	"Naj bogovi slišijo"	Slovene	18	17	No semi-finals	
1999	Darja Švajger	"For a Thousand Years"	English	11	50	No semi-finals	
2001	Nuša Derenda	"Energy"	English	7	70	No semi-finals	
2002	Sestre	"Samo ljubezen"	Slovene	13	33	No semi-finals	
2003	Karmen Stavec	"Nanana"	English	23	7	No semi-finals	
2004	Platin	"Stay Forever"	English	Failed to qualify		21	5
2005	Omar Naber	"Stop"	Slovene	Failed to qualify		12	69
2006	Anžej Dežan	"Mr Nobody"	English	Failed to qualify		16	49
2007	Alenka Gotar	"Cvet z juga"	Slovene	15	66	7	140
2008	Rebeka Dremelj	"Vrag naj vzame"	Slovene	Failed to qualify		11	36
2009	Quartissimo feat. Martina	"Love Symphony"	English, Slovene	Failed to qualify		16	14
2010	Ansambel Žlindra and Kalamari	"Narodnozabavni rock"	Slovene	Failed to qualify		16	6
2011	Maja Keuc	"No One"	English	13	96	3	112
2012	Eva Boto	"Verjamem"	Slovene	Failed to qualify		17	31
2013	Hannah	"Straight into Love"	English	Failed to qualify		16 ◁	8
2014	Tinkara Kovač	"Round and Round"	English, Slovene	25	9	10	52
2015	Maraaya	"Here for You"	English	14	39	5	92
2016	ManuElla	"Blue and Red"	English	Failed to qualify		14	57
2017	Omar Naber	"On My Way"	English	Failed to qualify		17	36
2018	Lea Sirk	"Hvala, ne!"	Slovene	22	64	8	132
2019	Zala Kralj and Gašper Šantl	"Sebi"	Slovene	15	105	6	167
2020	Ana Soklič ◇	"Voda" ◇	Slovene ◇	Contest cancelled (Note: The 2020 contest was cancelled due to the COVID-19 pandemic.)			
2021	Ana Soklič	"Amen"	English	Failed to qualify		13	44
2022	LPS	"Disko"	Slovene	Failed to qualify		17 ◁	15
2023	Joker Out	"Carpe Diem"	Slovene	21	78	5	103
2024	Raiven	"Veronika"	Slovene	23	27	9	51
2025	Klemen	"How Much Time Do We Have Left"	English	Failed to qualify		13	23

== Trivia ==
=== Songs by language ===
1. English (44.4%)
2. Slovene (55.6%)

Songs	Language	Years
19	Slovene	1993, 1995, 1996, 1997, 1998, 2002, 2005, 2007, 2008, 2009, 2010, 2012, 2014, 2018, 2019, ~~2020~~, 2022, 2023, 2024
14	English	1999, 2001, 2003, 2004, 2006, 2009, 2011, 2013, 2014, 2015, 2016, 2017, 2021, 2025

=== Selection process ===
Year	Selection process
1993	Slovenski izbor za Pesem Evrovizije with 12 participants
1995	Slovenski izbor za Pesem Evrovizije with 12 participants
1996	EMA with 11 participants
1997	EMA with 13 participants
1998	EMA with 14 participants
1999	EMA with 17 participants
2001	EMA with 22 participants
2002	EMA with 18 participants
2003	EMA with 16 participants
2004	EMA with 32 participants
2005	EMA with 14 participants
2006	EMA with 14 participants

Year	Selection process
2007	EMA with 24 participants
2008	EMA with 20 participants
2009	EMA with 20 participants
2010	EMA with 20 participants
2011	EMA with 10 participants
2012	Misija Evrovizija with 32 participants
2013	Internal selection
2014	EMA with 7 participants
2015	EMA with 8 participants
2016	EMA with 10 participants
2017	EMA with 16 participants
2018	EMA with 16 participants

Year	Selection process
2019	EMA with 10 participants
~~2020~~	EMA Freš with 18 participants EMA with 12 participants
2021	Internal selection
2022	EMA Freš with 24 participants EMA with 20 participants
2023	Internal selection
2024	Internal selection
2025	EMA with 12 participants

== Related involvement ==
=== Heads of delegation ===
Each participating broadcaster in the Eurovision Song Contest assigns a head of delegation as the EBU's contact person and the leader of their delegation at the event. The delegation, whose size can greatly vary, includes a head of press, the performers, songwriters, composers, and backing vocalists, among others.

Year	Head of delegation	Ref.
2009	Petar Radović	
2010–2022	Aleksander Radić	
2023–2024	Maša Kljun	
2025	Aleksander Radić	

=== Costume designers ===
Year	Costume designers	Ref.
2005	Jelena Proković	
2023	Damir Raković	
2024	Anika Opara	
2025	Vesna Mirtelj	

=== Jury members ===
Each participating broadcaster assembles a five-member jury panel consisting of music industry professionals for the semi-finals and final of the Eurovision Song Contest, ranking all entries except for their own. The juries' votes constitute 50% of the overall result in the Eurovision grand final alongside televoting. This was previously the case in the semi-finals as well until the 2023 contest, when the juries were dropped in favour of 100% public voting. The jury panel does still judge semi-final performances in the case of any issues with public televoting. The modern incarnation of jury voting was introduced beginning with the 2009 contest.

Jury members
Year	1st member	2nd member	3rd member	4th member	5th member	Ref.
2009	Anžej Dežan	Nuša Derenda	Matjaž Vlašič	Aida Kurtovič	Dušan Hren	
2010	Urša Vlašič	Miroslav Akrapovič	Sandra Feketija	Matjaž Bogataj	Dušan Hren	
2011	Mojca Menart	Lovro Ravbar	Nuša Derenda	Eva Černe	Miha Vardjan	
2012	Slavko Ivančič	Omar Naber	Raay	Lea Sirk	Urša Vlašič	
2013	Dušan Hren	Urša Vlašič	Darja Švajger	Raay	Katja Koren	
2014	Helena Blagne	Anže Langus Petrovič	Robert Pikl	Izak Košir	Alya	
2015	Tinkara Kovač	Andrej Šifrer	Sandra Feketija	Miha Gorše	Alex Volasko	
2016	Marjetka Vovk	Tadej Košir	Klemen Mramor	Urša Vlašič	Eva Hren	
2017	Darja Švajger	Nika Zorjan	Aleksander Lavrini	Gaber Radojevič	Jernej Dirnbek	
2018	Raiven	Mistermash	Nikola Sekulovič	Mitja Bobič	Alenka Godec	
2019	Žiga Klančar	Urša Mihevc	Ula Ložar	Mate Bro	Urša Vlašič	
2021	Bojan Cvjetićanin	Nuša Derenda	Boštjan Grabnar	Amaya	Raay	
2022	Alenka Godec	Arne Međedović	Gaber Radojevič	Lucija Harum	Tilen Artač	
2023	Ditka	Lara Baruca	Matjaž Vlašič	Hugo Smeh	Jernej Sobočan	
2024	Filip Vidušin	Martin Štibernik	Matevž Česen	Lea Sirk	Maja Keuc	
2025	Gregor Starsbergar	Jon Vitezič	Urban Koritnik	Ana Soklič	Eva Boto	

=== Hostings ===
Slovenia has never hosted the Eurovision Song Contest, though the EBU selected RTVSLO to host the qualification round Kvalifikacija za Millstreet for the 1993 contest. The show, which was broadcast on 3 April 1993 from RTVSLO's studios in Ljubljana, was presented by Tajda Lekše.

=== Conductors ===
Between 1993 and 1998, Slovenia sent a native conductor to the contest every year the country took part until the orchestra was dropped by the EBU in 1999.

Year	Conductor (Note: All conductors are of Slovene nationality unless otherwise noted.)	Notes	Ref.
1993 (KzM)	Petar Ugrin	(Note: Musical director; also conducted the Hungarian entry. The closing music was conducted by Mojmir Sepe.)	
1993	Jože Privšek		
1995	Jože Privšek		
1996	Jože Privšek		
1997	Mojmir Sepe		
1998	Mojmir Sepe	(Note: Sepe was intended to conduct the 1998 entry, but a dispute with the songwriter led to it being performed to a backing track. Sepe still took the conductor's bow and cued in the music.)	

=== Commentators and spokespersons ===
For the show's broadcast on RTVSLO, various commentators have provided commentary on the contest in the Slovene language. At the Eurovision Song Contest after all points are calculated, the presenters of the show call upon each voting country to invite each respective spokesperson to announce the results of their vote on-screen. RTVSLO has also arranged radio broadcasts of the contest, featuring the respective semi-final that Slovenia is competing in and the grand final. RTVSLO has also organised a live broadcast of the final on its 4D platform with simultaneous television commentary. For the 2023 contest, Žana E. Čeh provided online commentary. On 4 December 2025, alongside announcing its withdrawal from the 2026 contest, RTVSLO confirmed that it would not broadcast the event at all. This will be the first occasion since the 1985 contest that Slovenia’s broadcaster will not provide a live transmission, and the first time since independence that the contest will not be broadcast in the country.

From 1961 until 1991, SR Slovenia was part of Yugoslavia and JRT's affiliate RTV Ljubljana broadcast the contest with Slovenian commentary.

Year	Television		Radio		Spokesperson	Ref.
Year	Channel	Commentator(s)	Channel	Commentator(s)	Spokesperson	Ref.
1992	SLO 1	Miša Molk	No broadcast		Did not participate	
1993	SLO 1	Tajda Lekše	Radio Val 202	Unknown	Miša Molk (Note: The spokesperson from the prequalifying round was Mojmir Sepe)	
1994	SLO 1	Damjana Golavšek	Radio Val 202	Unknown	Did not participate	
1995	SLO 1	Damjana Golavšek	Radio Val 202	Unknown	Miša Molk	
1996	SLO 1	Miša Molk	Radio Val 202	Unknown	Mario Galunič	
1997	SLO 1 (Slovene), TV Koper-Capodistria (Italian)	Unknown	Radio Val 202	Andrej Karoli	Mojca Mavec	
1998	SLO 1	Unknown	Radio Val 202	Andrej Karoli	Mojca Mavec	
1999	SLO 1	Unknown	Radio Val 202	Andrej Karoli	Mira Berginc	
2000	SLO 1	Unknown	Radio Val 202	Andrej Hofer	Did not participate	
2001	SLO 1	Unknown	No broadcast		Mojca Mavec	
2002	SLO 1	Unknown	No broadcast		Nuša Derenda	
2003	SLO 2	Andrea F	No broadcast		Peter Poles	
2004	TV SLO 1 (final); TV SLO 2 (semi-finals)	Andrea F	Unknown	Jernej Vene	Peter Poles	
2005	TV SLO 1 (final); TV SLO 2 (semi-finals)	Mojca Mavec	Radio Val 202	Jernej Vene	Katarina Čas	
2006	TV SLO 1 (final); TV SLO 2 (semi-finals)	Mojca Mavec	No broadcast		Peter Poles	
2007	TV SLO 1 (final); TV SLO 2 (semi-finals)	Mojca Mavec	Radio Val 202	Jernej Vene and Aida Kurtović	Peter Poles	
2008	TV SLO 1 (final); TV SLO 2 (semi-finals)	Andrej Hofer	Radio Val 202	Aida Kurtović	Peter Poles	
2009	TV SLO 1 (final); TV SLO 2 (semi-finals)	Andrej Hofer	Radio Val 202	Aida Kurtović	Peter Poles	
2010	TV SLO 1 (final); TV SLO 2 (semi-finals)	Andrej Hofer	No broadcast		Andrea F	
2011	TV SLO 1 (final); TV SLO 2 (semi-finals)	Andrej Hofer	Radio Val 202	Maruša Kerec	Klemen Slakonja	
2012	TV SLO 1 (final); TV SLO 2 (semi-finals)	Andrej Hofer	Radio Val 202	Maruša Kerec	Lorella Flego	
2013	TV SLO 1 (final); TV SLO 2 (semi-finals)	Andrej Hofer	Radio Val 202	Maruša Kerec	Andrea F	
2014	TV SLO 1 (final); TV SLO 2 (semi-finals)	Andrej Hofer	Radio Val 202; Radio Maribor	Ana Maria Mitic and Domen Savič	Ula Furlan	
2015	TV SLO 1 (final); TV SLO 2 (semi-finals)	Andrej Hofer	Radio Val 202; Radio Maribor	Anja Hlača Ferjančič and Maruša Kerec	Tinkara Kovač	
2016	TV SLO 1 (final); TV SLO 2 (semi-finals)	Andrej Hofer	Radio Val 202; Radio Maribor	Andrej Karoli	Marjetka Vovk	
2017	TV SLO 1 (final); TV SLO 2 (semi-finals)	Andrej Hofer	Radio Val 202; Radio Maribor	Miha Šalehar and Maruša Kerec	Katarina Čas	
2018	TV SLO 1 (final); TV SLO 2 (semi-finals)	Andrej Hofer	Radio Val 202; Radio Maribor	Miha Šalehar and Maruša Kerec	Amaya	
2019	TV SLO 1 (final); TV SLO 2 (semi-finals)	Andrej Hofer	Radio Val 202; Radio Maribor	Andrej Karoli	Lea Sirk	
2021	TV SLO 1 (final); TV SLO 2 (semi-finals)	Mojca Mavec	Radio Val 202; Radio Maribor	Miha Šalehar, Neja Jerant and Uršula Zaletelj	Lorella Flego	
2022	TV SLO 1 (final); TV SLO 2 (semi-finals)	Andrej Hofer	Radio Val 202; Radio Maribor	Maruša Kerec	Lorella Flego	
2023	TV SLO 1 (final); TV SLO 2 (semi-finals)	Andrej Hofer	Radio Val 202; Radio Maribor	Maja Stepančič, Maruša Kerec, Neja Jerant and Uršula Zaletelj (SF2); Maja Stepančič, Miha Šalehar and Uršula Zaletelj (final)	Melani Mekicar	
2024	TV SLO 1 (SF1, final); TV SLO 2 (SF2)	Mojca Mavec	Radio Val 202	Maj Valerij and Igor Bračič	Lorella Flego	
2025	TV SLO 1 (final); TV SLO 2 (semi-finals)	Mojca Mavec	Radio Val 202	Maj Valerij (SF1, final) and Igor Bračič (final)	Lorella Flego	
2026	No broadcast		No broadcast		Did not participate	

==== Other shows ====
Show	Commentators	Channel	Ref.
Kvalifikacija za Millstreet	Gregor Krajc	TV SLO 1	
Congratulations: 50 Years of the Eurovision Song Contest	Andrej Hofer	TV SLO 1	
Eurovision Song Contest's Greatest Hits	No commentary	TV SLO 1	
Eurovision: Europe Shine a Light	Andrej Hofer	TV SLO 1	

== Photo gallery ==
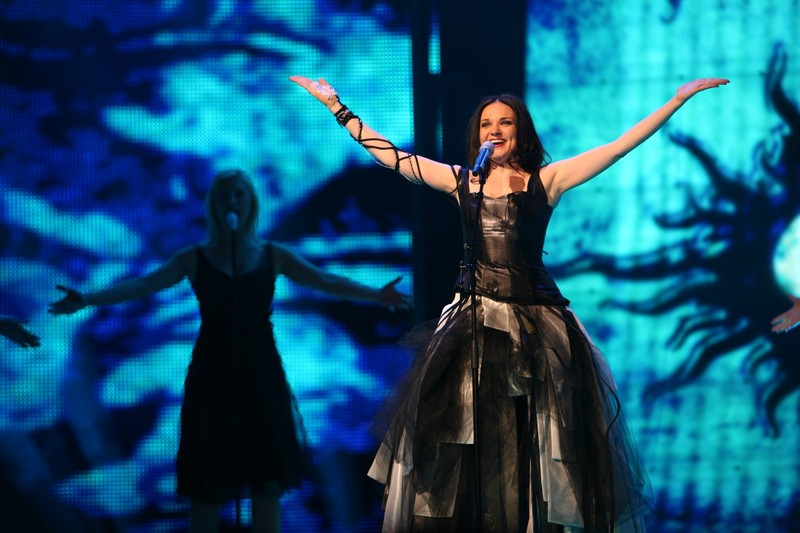
Alenka Gotar performing "Cvet z juga" in Helsinki (2007)

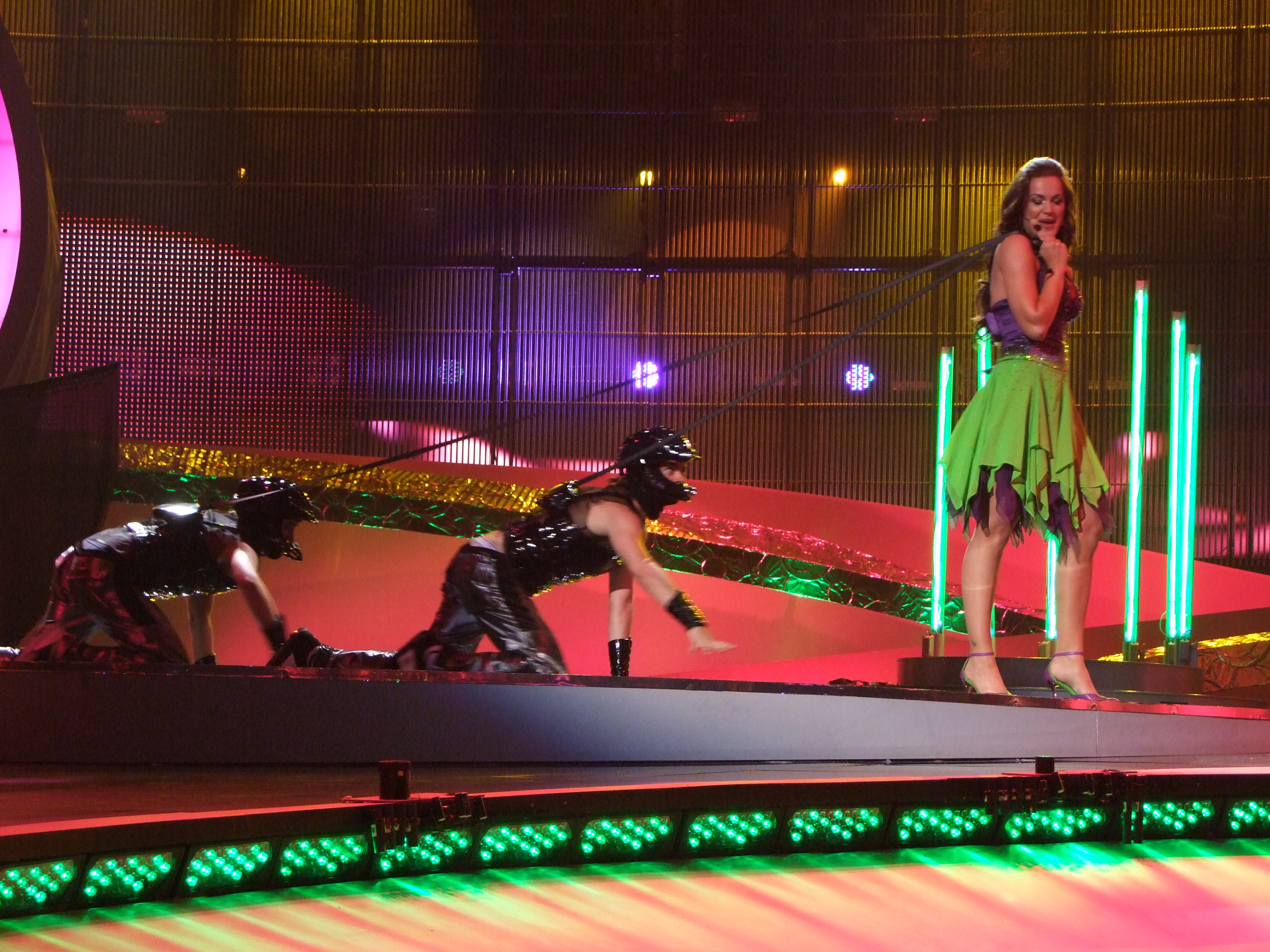
Rebeka Dremelj performing "Vrag naj vzame" in Belgrade (2008)

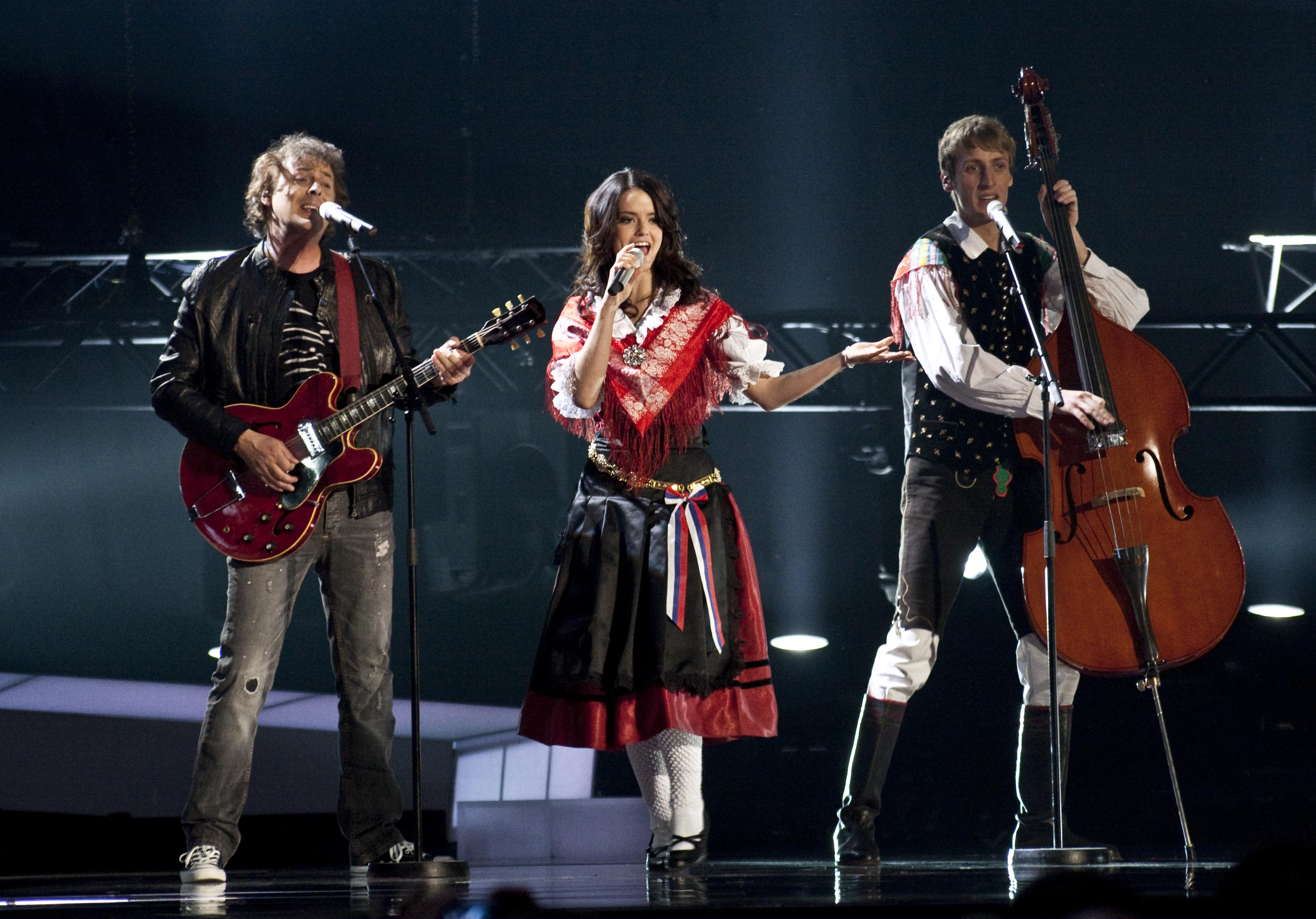
Ansambel Žlindra and Kalamari performing "Narodnozabavni rock" in Oslo (2010)

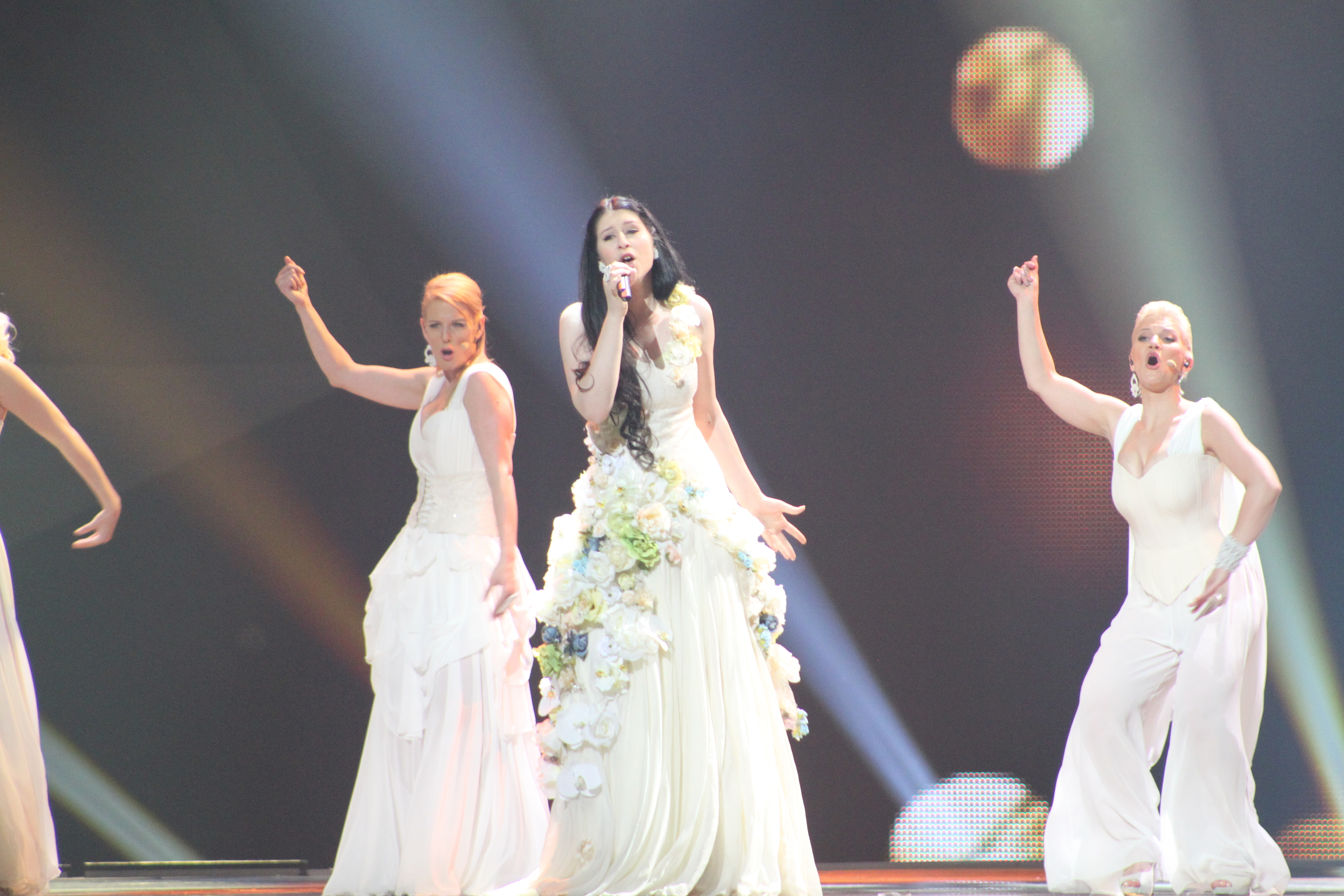
Eva Boto performing "Verjamem" in Baku (2012)

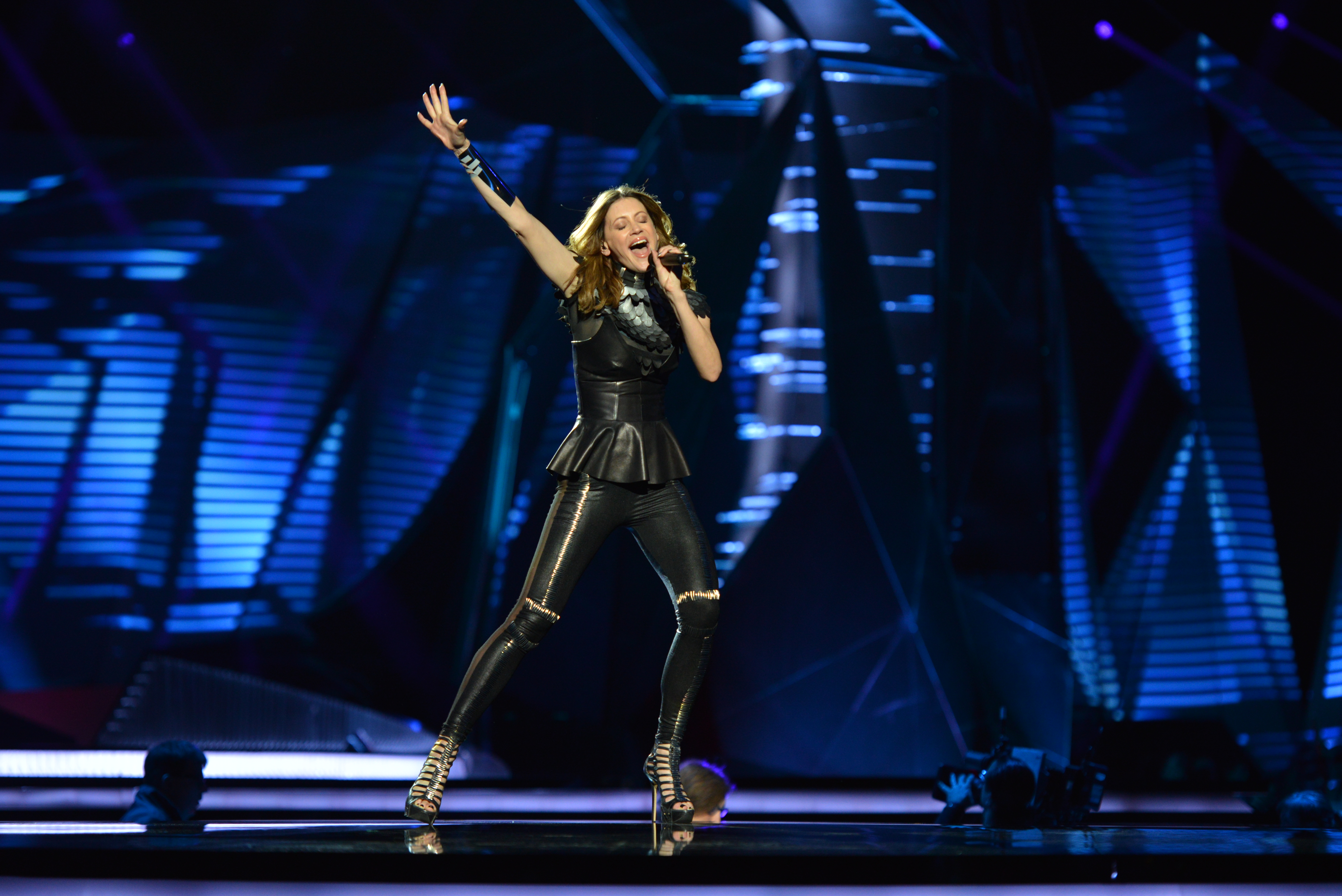
Hannah Mancini performing "Straight Into Love" in Malmö (2013)

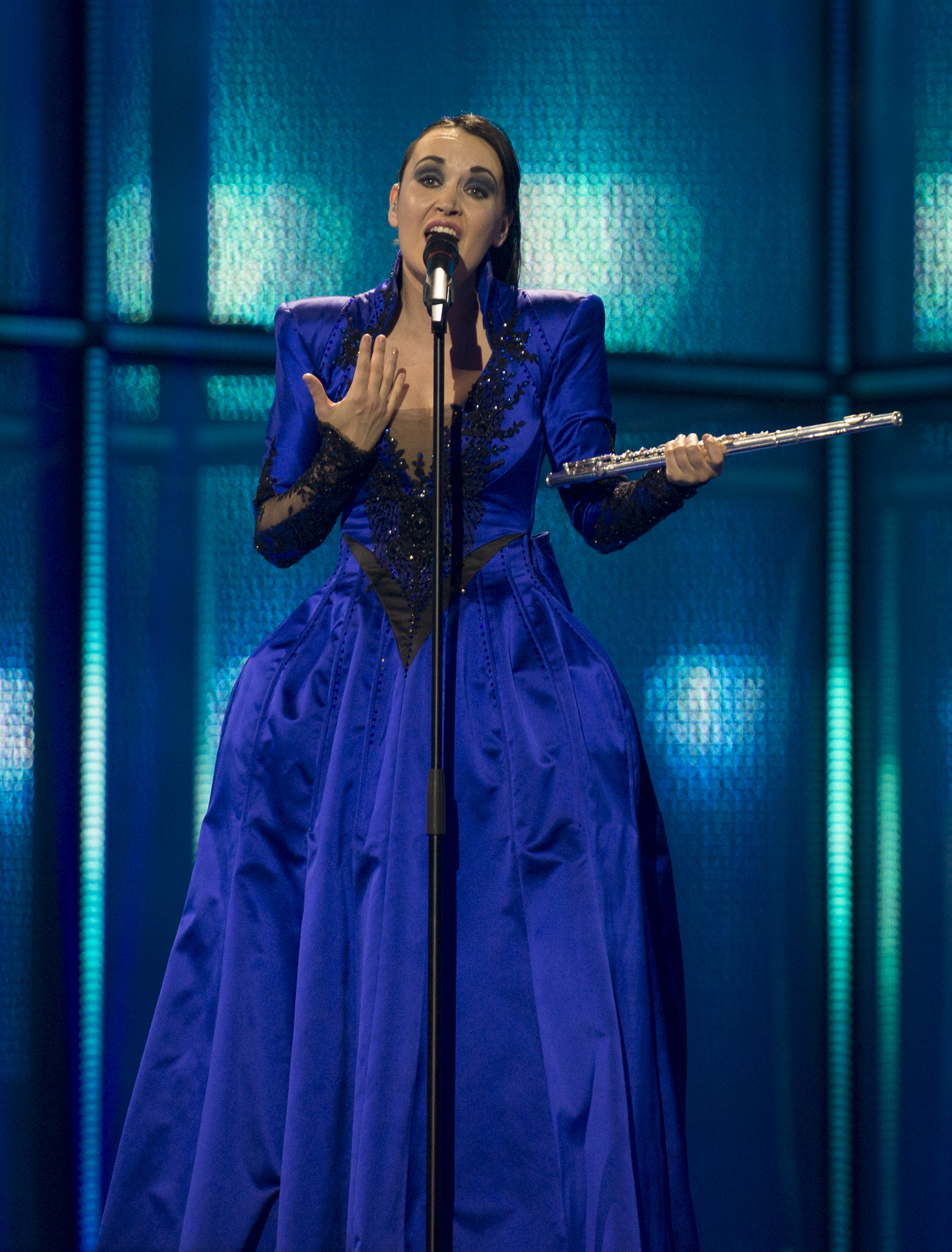
Tinkara Kovač performing "Round and Round" in Copenhagen (2014)

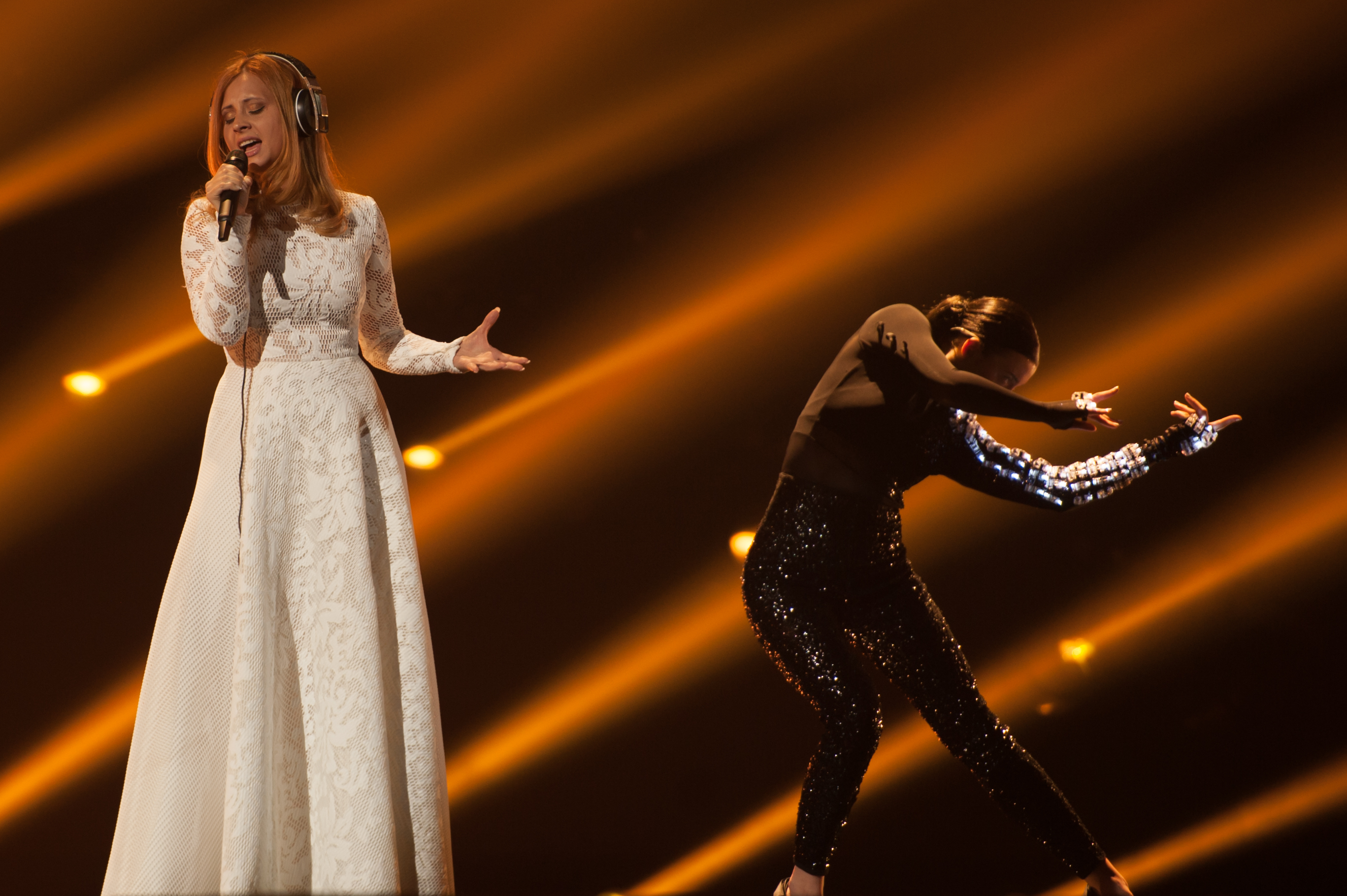
Maraaya performing "Here for You" in Vienna (2015)

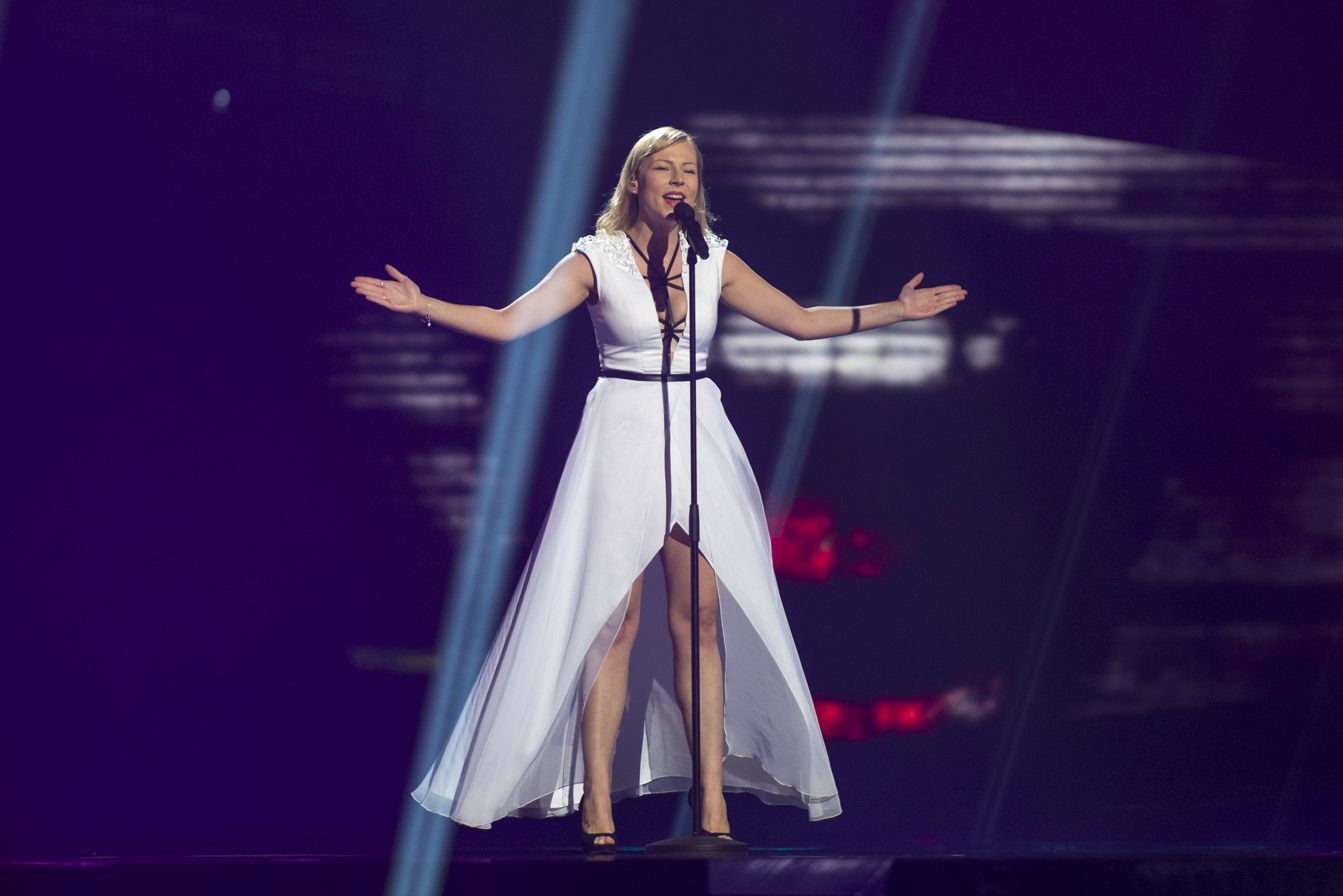
ManuElla performing "Blue and Red" in Stockholm (2016)

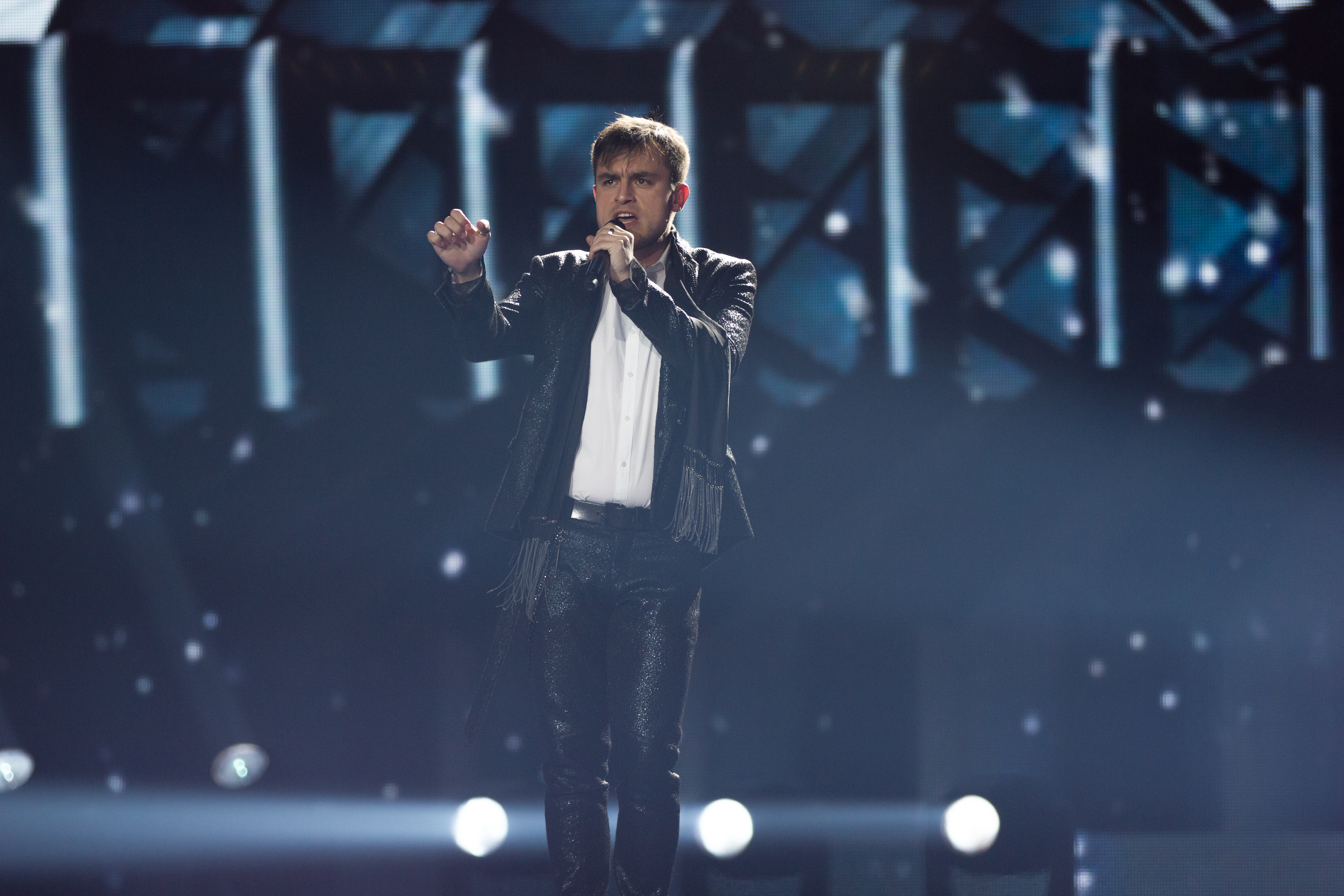
Omar Naber performing "On My Way" in Kyiv (2017)

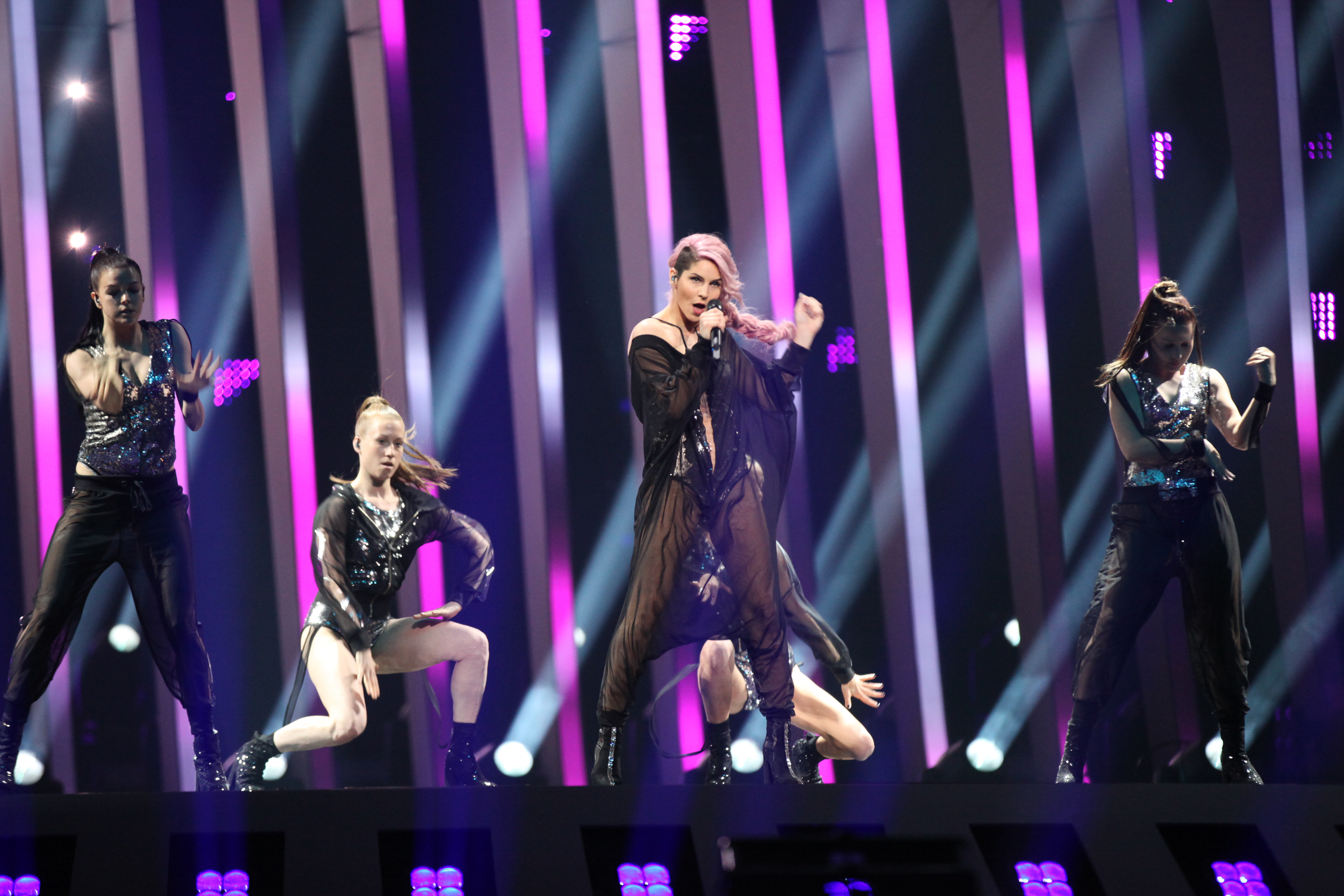
Lea Sirk performing "Hvala, ne!" in Lisbon (2018)

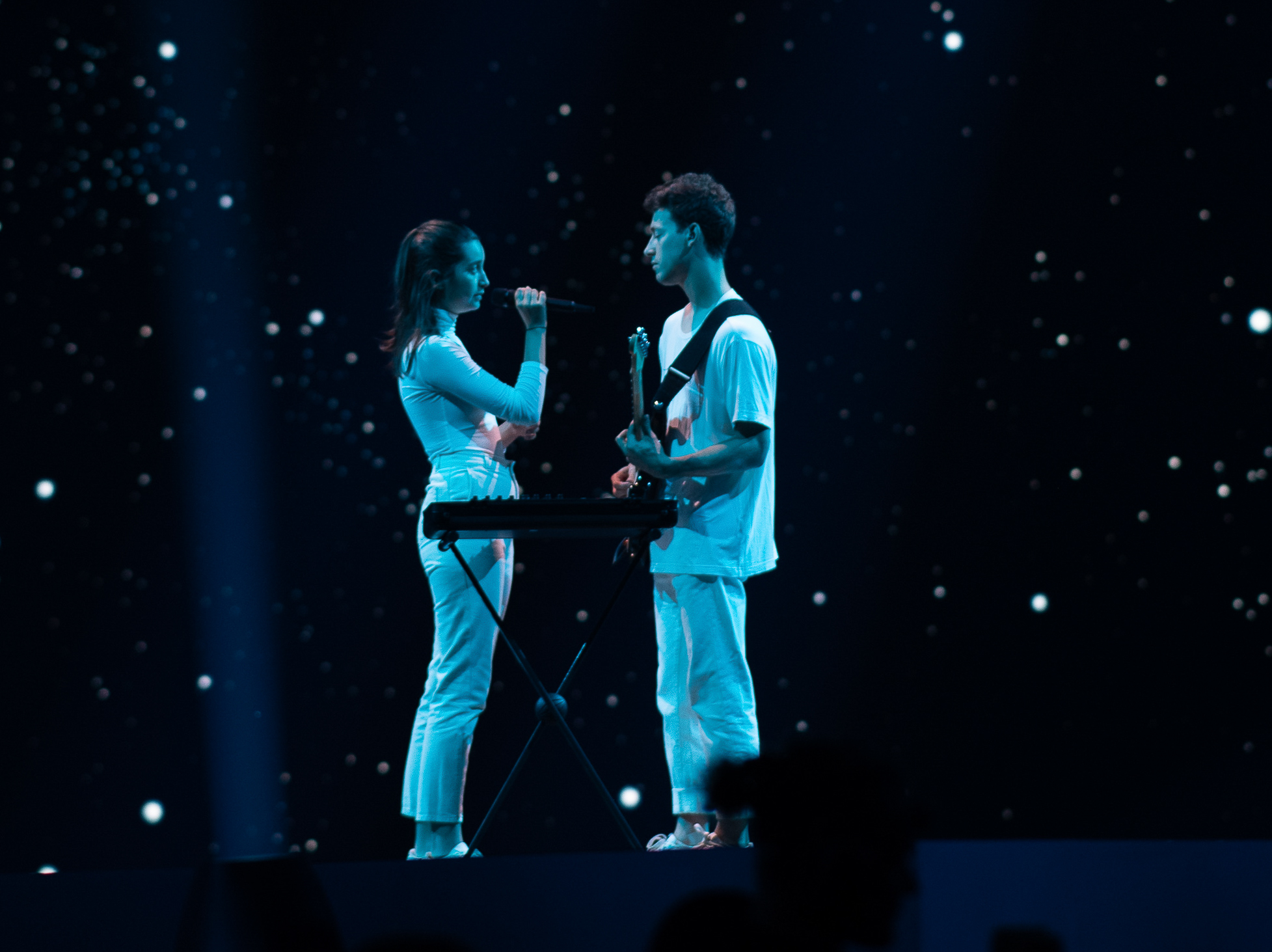
Zala Kralj & Gašper Šantl performing "Sebi" in Tel Aviv (2019)

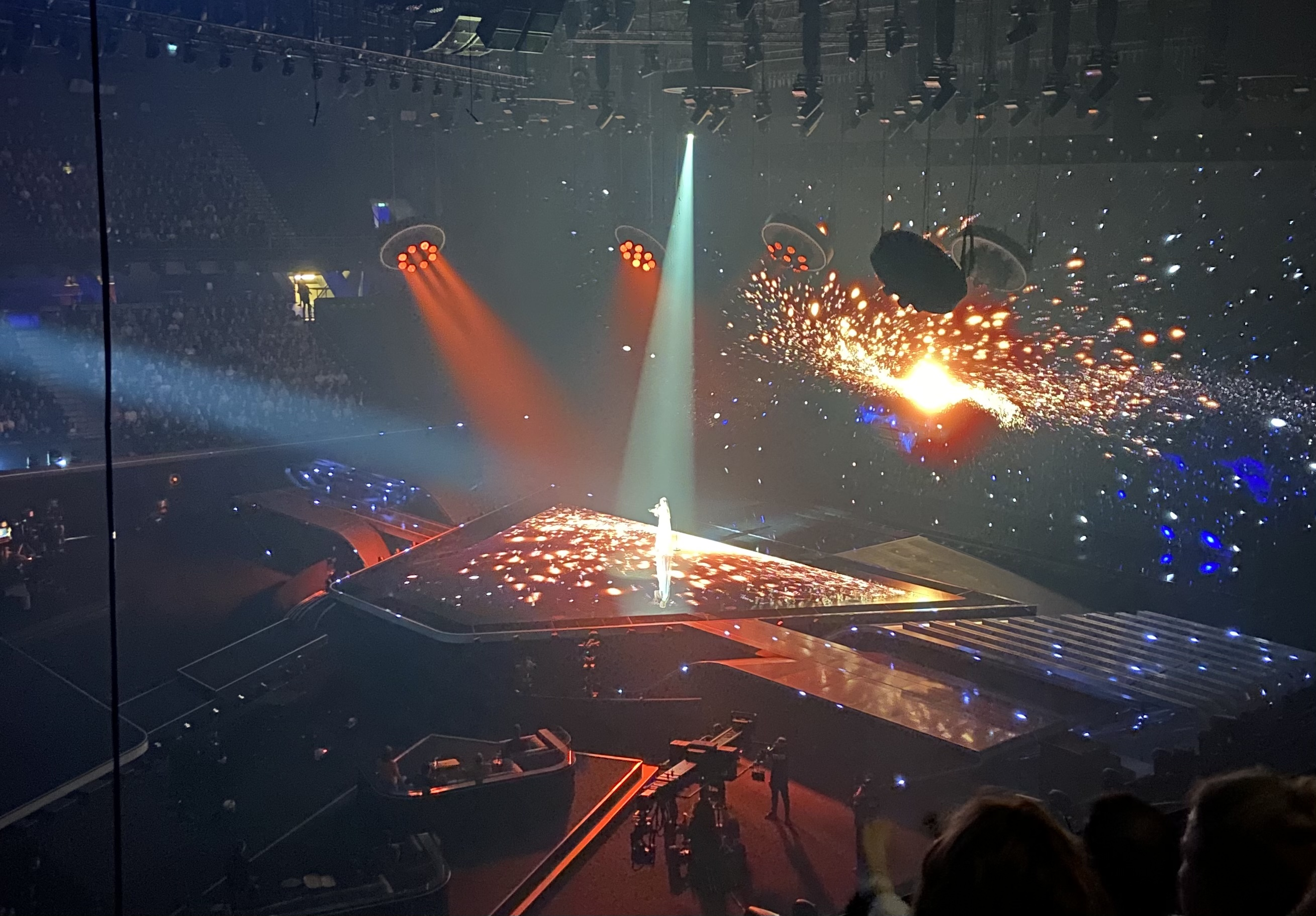
Ana Soklič performing "Amen" in Rotterdam (2021)

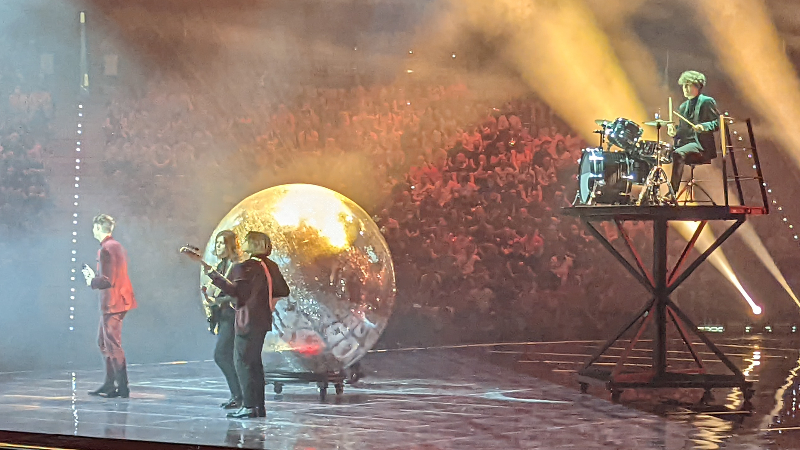
LPS performing "Disko" in Turin (2022)

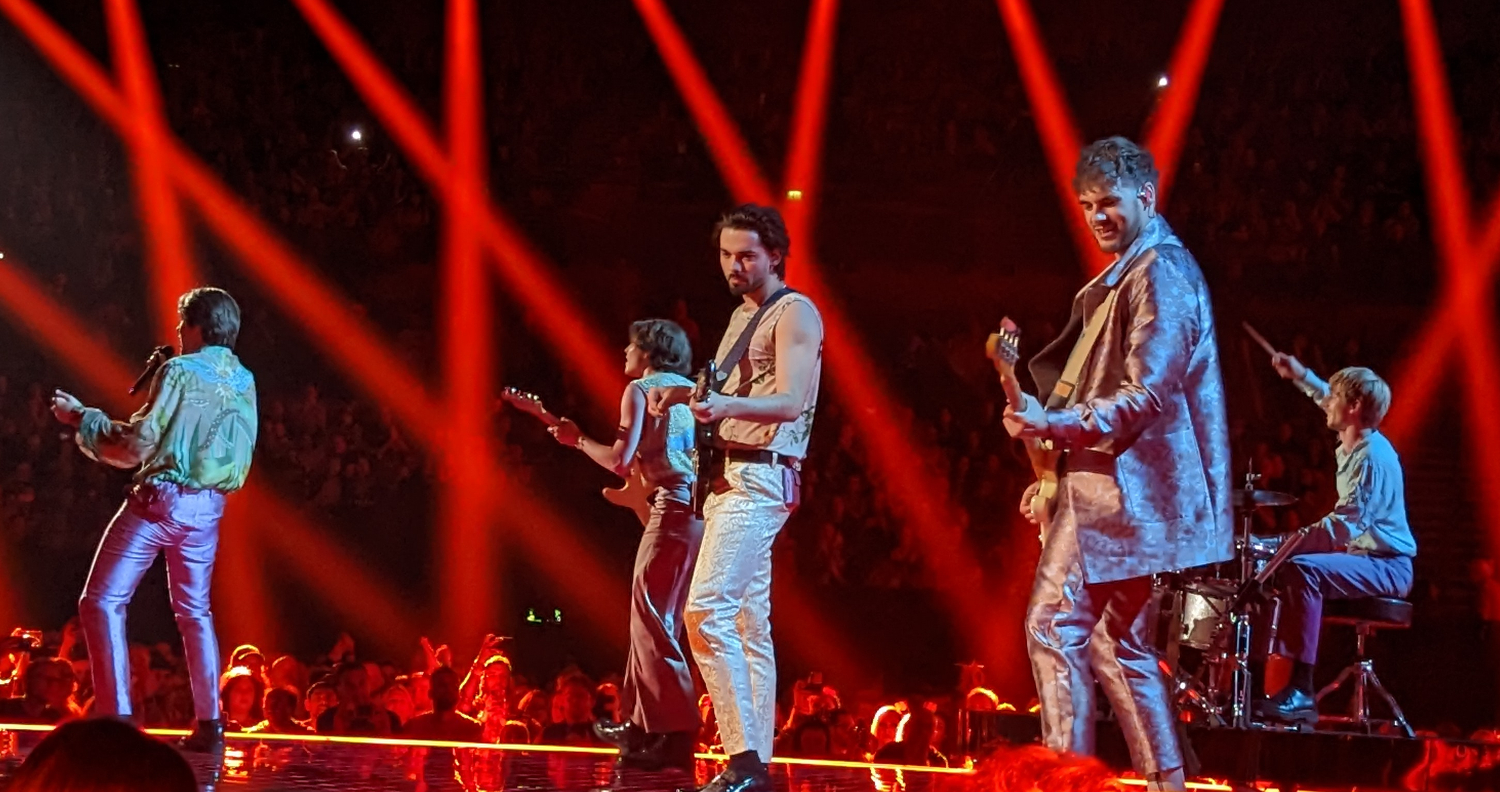
Joker Out performing "Carpe Diem" in Liverpool (2023)

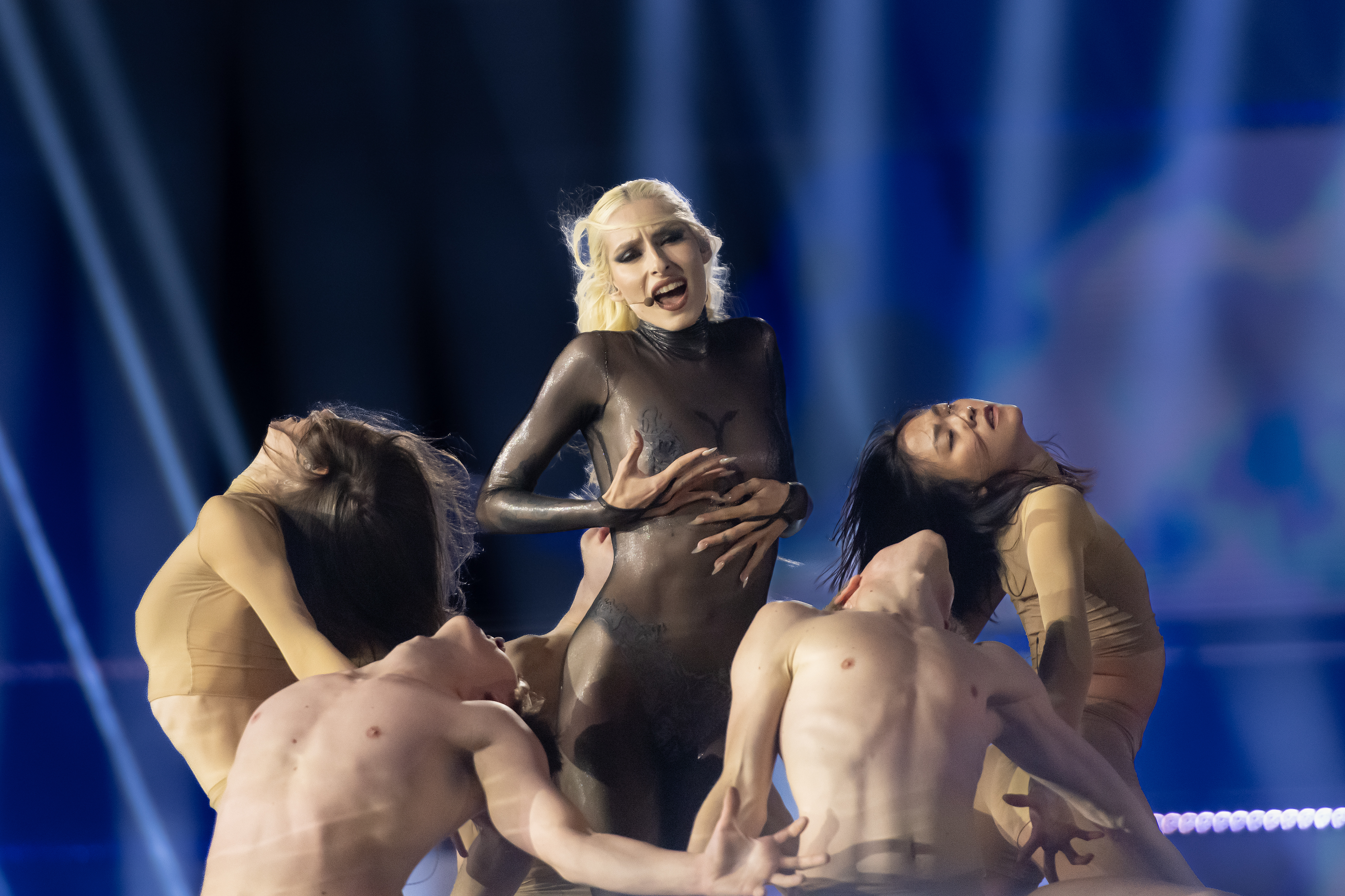
Raiven performing "Veronika" in Malmö (2024)

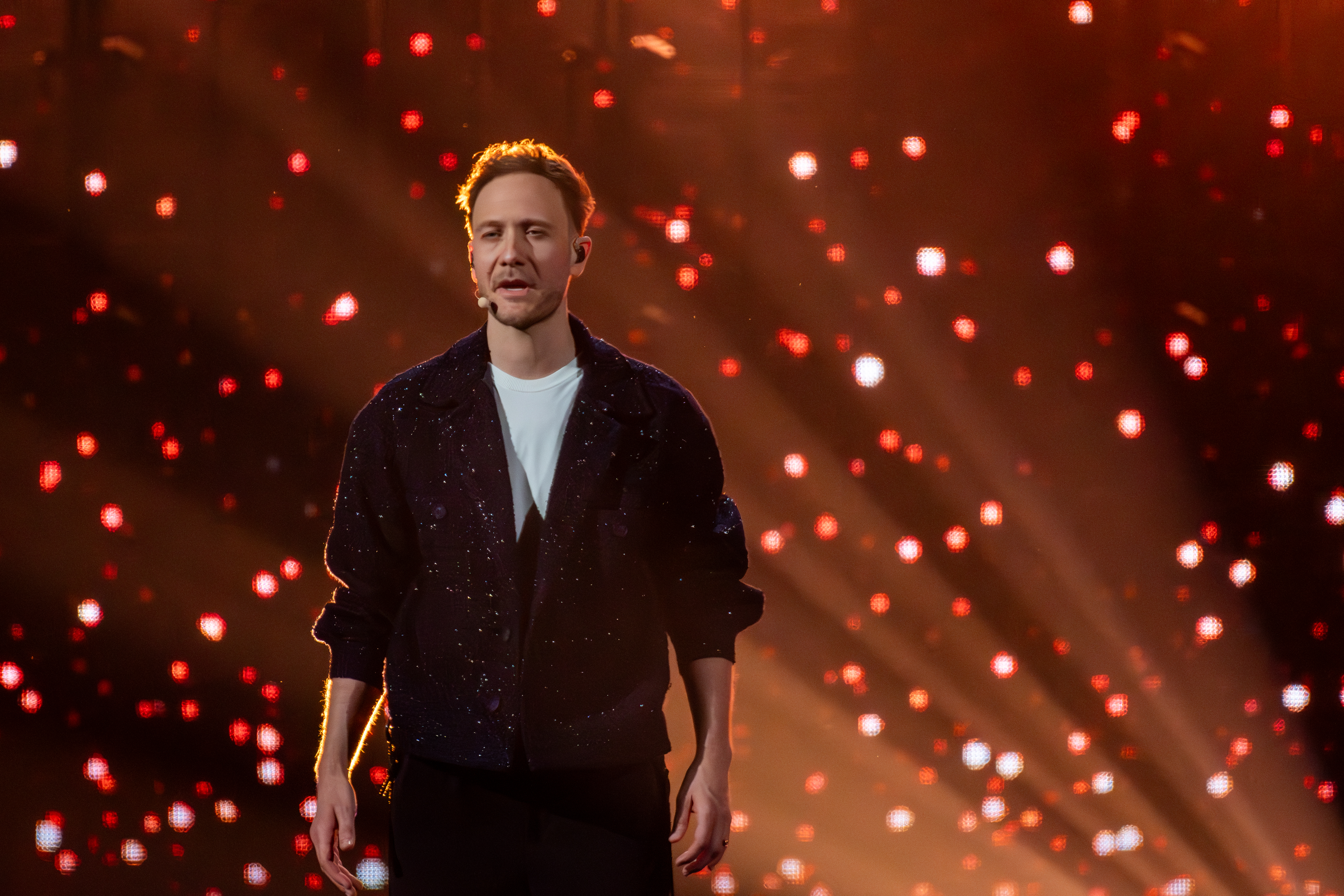
Klemen performing "How Much Time Do We Have Left" in Basel (2025)

== See also ==
- Slovenia in the Eurovision Young Musicians
- Slovenia in the Junior Eurovision Song Contest
- Slovenia in the Eurovision Young Dancers
