= Gaja Prestor =

Slovenian singer

- Born: 22 April 2000 (age 26); Celje, Slovenia
- Genres: Pop
- Occupation: Singer
- Instrument: Vocals
- Years active: 2018–present
- Label: Menart Records

Gaja Prestor (born 22 April 2000) is a Slovenian singer.

== Career ==
Prestor's first TV appearance was in 2016 when she entered Slovenija ima talent, the Slovenian version of Got Talent. At the auditions she sang a rendition of "I Dreamed a Dream" but ultimately failed to advance to the live shows. Prestor's debut single "To je kar imam" was released on 18 March 2018 through Menart Records. Prestor wrote the song together with Žan Serčič and since its release the song has accumulated nearly 250,000 views. Prestor successfully continued collaborating with Serčič, with whom she wrote her following single "Ona". She was also featured on "Nazaj" by Žan Serčič. On 9 December 2018 she released her third single "Decembra". Through 2019, Pestor released two more standalone singles, "Najino nebo" and "Le tebe rabim", respectively.

On 20 December 2019, Prestor was announced as one of the 12 participants in EMA 2020, the national contest in Slovenia to select the country's Eurovision Song Contest 2020 entry, with the song "Verjamem vase".

== Discography ==
=== Singles ===
- "Sledi" (2022)
- "Zame" (2021)
- "Verjamem vase" (2020)
- "Le tebe rabim" (2019)
- "Najino nebo" (2019)
- "To je kar imam" (2018)
- "Ona" (2018)
- "Decembra" (2018)

== Awards and nominations ==
Year	Association	Category	Nominee / work	Result	Ref.
2019	Žaromet Awards	Song of the Year	"Ona"	Nominated	
2019	Žaromet Awards	Internet Star	Gaja Prestor	Nominated	
