= Zalagasper =

Slovenian musical project

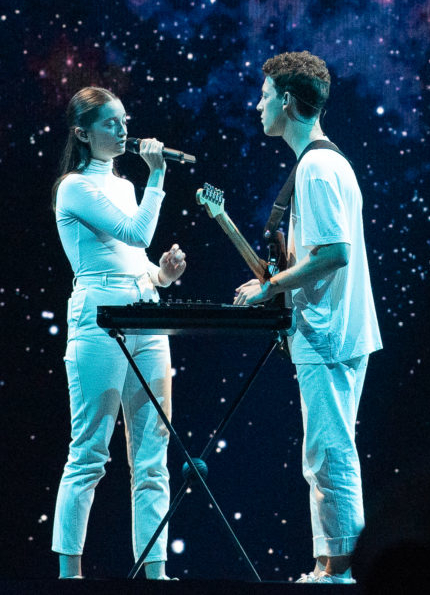
- zalagasper at the 2019 Eurovision Song Contest

Background information
- Also known as: Zala Kralj & Gašper Šantl
- Origin: Maribor, Slovenia
- Genres: Minimal; lo-fi; indie pop
- Years active: 2018–present
- Label: Universal Music Slovenia
- Members: Gašper Šantl
- Past members: Zala Kralj

Zalagasper (stylised in all lowercase, formerly Zala Kralj & Gašper Šantl) is a Slovenian musical project from Maribor consisting of multi-instrumentalist and vocalist Gašper Šantl. As a duo with former lead vocalist Zala Kralj, Zalagasper represented Slovenia in the Eurovision Song Contest 2019 with the song "Sebi", finishing 15th (Note: France and Slovenia both received a combined total of 105 points, However, Slovenia was placed higher as it had been awarded more points in the televote than France.) (out of 26 entrants) in the final. The duo formed in 2018 after Kralj had begun performing vocals on some songs written and produced by Šantl. Initially, Kralj was only credited as a featured artist. They released the singles "Valovi", "Baloni", and "S teboi" in 2018, before releasing their debut extended play Štiri in February 2019.

In 2023, Kralj ended her music career and left the duo in order to pursue studies at the University of Maribor, studying Slovene literature and the English language. Šantl continued the musical project as a solo artist. Kralj and Šantl have continued their private romantic relationship following the end of Kralj's music career.

== Members ==
- Zala Kralj – vocals, sampler (2018–2023)
- Gašper Šantl – guitar, sampler, production, vocals (2018–present)

== Discography ==
=== Studio albums ===
Title	Details
4	Released: 14 February 2020; Label: Universal Music Slovenia; Formats: LP, Digital download
Love Letter	Released: 6 May 2022; Label: Universal Music Slovenia; Formats: Digital download

=== Extended plays ===
Title	Details
Štiri	Released: 16 February 2019; Label: Universal Music Slovenia; Formats: Digital download

=== Singles ===
Title	Year	Peak chart positions				Album
Title	Year	SLO	CRO	SWE Heat.	SWI	Album
"Valovi" (Note: "Valovi", "Baloni", "S teboi" and "Sebi" also feature on the EP Štiri.)	2018	—	—	—	—	4
"Baloni"	2018	—	—	—	—	4
"S teboi"	2018	—	—	—	—	4
"Sebi"	2019	2	—	13	77	4
"Come to Me"	2019	—	—	—	—	4
"Signals"	2019	—	—	—	—	4
"Me & My Boi"	2020	—	—	—	—	4
"Box"	2020	—	82	—	—	4
"Origami"	2020	—	—	—	—	Love Letter
"Sto idej"	2020	—	—	—	—	Non-album single
"Xoxo"	2021	—	—	—	—	Love Letter
"Love Letter"	2022	—	—	—	—	Love Letter
"Oblike oblakov"	2022	—	—	—	—	Love Letter
"Carta" (featuring Blackpanda)	2022	—	—	—	—	Love Letter
"Morski psi"	2023	—	—	—	—	Non-album singles
"Utiram si pot"	2024	—	—	—	—	Non-album singles
"—" denotes a single that did not chart or was not released.

=== Music videos ===
Year	Video	Director	Ref.
2018	"S teboi"	Žiga Krajnc	
2019	"Sebi"	Žiga Krajnc	
2019	"Come to Me"	Masha Zhemchuzhina	
2019	"Signals"	Luka Šantl	
2020	"Box"	Miha Likar	
2021	"Xoxo"	Teja Milavec	
2022	"Love Letter"	Lana Bregar	
2022	"Carta"		
2022	"Teabag in the Sink"	Bonino Englaro	
2023	"Morski psi"	Zala Kralj	
2024	"Utiram se pot"	Luka Šantl	

== Awards and nominations ==
Year	Association	Category	Nominee / work	Result	Ref.
2018	Zlata piščal	Song of the Year	"Valovi"	Won	
2019	Zlata piščal	Best New Artist	Zala Kralj & Gašper Šantl	Won	
2019	Zlata piščal	Song of the Year	"Sebi"	Nominated	

== Notes ==
Awards and achievements
Preceded by Lea Sirk with "Hvala, ne!"	Slovenia in the Eurovision Song Contest; 2019	Succeeded by Ana Soklič with "Voda"
