= Amen (Ana Soklič song) =

2021 song by Ana Soklič

Single by Ana Soklič

from the album Born to the Fight
- Released: 27 February 2021
- Genre: Ballad
- Length: 3:04 (original version); 3:28 (extended version)
- Composers: Ana Soklič; Bojan Simončič; Žiga Pirnat
- Lyricists: Charlie Mason; Ana Soklič; Žiga Pirnat
- Producer: Žiga Pirnat

Ana Soklič singles chronology
"Voda" (2020)	"Amen" (2021)

Music video
- "Amen" on YouTube

Eurovision Song Contest 2021 entry
- Country: Slovenia
- Artist: Ana Soklič
- Language: English
- Composers: Ana Soklič; Bojan Simončič; Žiga Pirnat
- Lyricists: Charlie Mason; Ana Soklič; Žiga Pirnat

Finals performance
- Semi-final result: 13th
- Semi-final points: 44

Entry chronology
- ◄ "Voda" (2020)
- "Disko" (2022) ►

"Amen" is a song by Slovenian singer Ana Soklič. The song represented Slovenia in the Eurovision Song Contest 2021 in Rotterdam, the Netherlands.

== Eurovision Song Contest ==
=== Internal selection ===
On 16 May 2020, RTV Slovenija confirmed that Ana Soklič would represent Slovenia in the 2021 contest.

Following the announcement of Soklič as the selected artist, composers were able to submit their songs to the broadcaster between 13 July 2020 and 30 September 2020. 191 songs were received by the broadcaster during the submission period. An expert committee consisting of Soklič, Darja Švajger (singer, vocal coach and 1995 and 1999 Slovenian Eurovision entrant) and Vladimir Graić (composer of Serbia's winning Eurovision entry "Molitva" in 2007) shortlisted three songs from the received submissions, with the Slovenian entry being determined by an alternate expert committee consisting of Darja Švajger, Mojca Menart (Head of the publishing business of ZKP RTV Slovenija) and Matevž Šalehar (musician and singer-songwriter) from the three shortlisted songs.

The song was presented during the special show EMA 2021 on 27 February 2021 at the RTV Slovenija Studio 1 in Ljubljana, hosted by Lea Sirk and Nejc Šmit.

=== At Eurovision ===
The 65th edition of the Eurovision Song Contest took place in Rotterdam, the Netherlands and consisted of two semi-finals on 18 May and 20 May 2021, and the grand final on 22 May 2021. Ana Soklič performed in the first half of the first semi-final of the contest, but did not qualify for the final.

== Personnel ==
=== Production ===
- Ana Soklič – composer, lyricist
- Bojan Simončič – composer
- Charlie Mason – lyricist
- Žiga Pirnat – composer, lyricist, arranger, producer
- Dorian Holley – choral director
- Tony Maserati – sound engineer

=== Studio recording ===
- Ana Soklič – lead vocal
- Žiga Pirnat – orchestra conductor
- RTV Slovenia Symphony Orchestra – musical accompaniment
- American black choir – backvocals
- Perpetuum Jazzile – backvocals (a cappella version)

== Track listing ==
Born to the Fight (EP, digital), ZKP RTV Slovenija (label)

1. "Amen" (extended version) – 3:28
2. "Amen" (RnB Radio remix) – 3:25
3. "Amen" (Summer Vibes remix) – 4:28
4. "Amen" (featuring Perpetuum Jazzile, a cappella) – 3:09
5. "Amen" (original version) – 3:04
6. "Amen" (karaoke version) – 3:04
7. "Voda" (symphonic version) – 3:03
