= Voda (song) =

2020 song by Ana Soklič

Single by Ana Soklič
- Released: 20 March 2020
- Length: 3:01
- Label: ZKP RTVSLO
- Songwriters: Ana Soklič; Bojan Simončič
- Producer: Žiga Pirnat

Ana Soklič singles chronology
"Temni svet" (2019)	"Voda" (2020)	"Amen" (2021)

Eurovision Song Contest 2020 entry
- Country: Slovenia
- Artist: Ana Soklič
- Language: Slovene
- Composers: Ana Soklič; Bojan Simončič
- Lyricist: Ana Soklič

Finals performance
- Semi-final result: Contest cancelled

Entry chronology
- ◄ "Sebi" (2019)
- "Amen" (2021) ►

"Voda" (English: Water) is a song recorded by Slovenian singer Ana Soklič. Soklič wrote lyrics, while also composing the music alongside Bojan Simončič. It would have represented Slovenia at the Eurovision Song Contest 2020 in Rotterdam, Netherlands prior to its cancellation due to the COVID-19 pandemic.

== Eurovision Song Contest ==
RTVSLO allowed artists and composers to submit their entries for EMA 2020 between 1 August and 19 November 2019 for the selection of their entry for the Eurovision Song Contest 2020. On 20 December 2019, Soklič was confirmed as one of the 12 participants in EMA 2020 with the song "Voda". The song will represent Slovenia in the Eurovision Song Contest 2020, after Soklič was selected through EMA 2020, the music competition that selects Slovenia's entries for the Eurovision Song Contest on 22 February 2020. On 28 January 2020, a special allocation draw was held which placed each country into one of the two semi-finals, as well as which half of the show they would perform in. Slovenia was placed into the first semi-final, to be held on 12 May 2020, and was scheduled to perform in the first half of the show.

== Release history ==
Release history for "Voda"
Region	Date	Format	Label	Ref.
Slovenia	18 February 2020	Contemporary hit radio	RTVSLO	
