= Sebi (song) =

2019 single by Zalagasper

Single by Zala Kralj & Gašper Šantl

from the EP Štiri and the album 4
- Released: 16 February 2019
- Recorded: 2018
- Length: 3:17
- Label: Universal Music
- Songwriters: Zala Kralj; Gašper Šantl
- Producers: Zala Kralj; Gašper Šantl

Zala Kralj & Gašper Šantl singles chronology
"S teboi" (2018)	"Sebi" (2019)	"Come to Me" (2019)

Music video
- "Sebi" on YouTube

Eurovision Song Contest 2019 entry
- Country: Slovenia
- Artist: Zala Kralj & Gašper Šantl
- Language: Slovene
- Composers: Zala Kralj; Gašper Šantl
- Lyricists: Zala Kralj; Gašper Šantl

Finals performance
- Semi-final result: 6th
- Semi-final points: 167
- Final result: 15th
- Final points: 105

Entry chronology
- ◄ "Hvala, ne!" (2018)
- "Voda" (2020) ►

"Sebi" (English: To Myself) is a song performed by the Slovenian duo Zala Kralj & Gašper Šantl. The song was the Slovenian entry in the Eurovision Song Contest 2019 in Tel Aviv, Israel. The song was performed at the first semi-final and progressed to the final, where it finished in 15th place.

== Eurovision Song Contest ==
On 23 December 2018, Zala Kralj & Gašper Šantl were confirmed as one of the 10 participants in EMA 2019 with the song "Sebi". They won the national final on 16 February 2019 and therefore were given the rights to represent Slovenia in the Eurovision Song Contest 2019 in Tel Aviv, Israel. On 28 January 2019, a special allocation draw was held which placed each country into one of the two semi-finals, as well as which half of the show they would perform in. Slovenia was placed into the first semi-final, to be held on 14 May 2019, and was scheduled to perform in the first half of the show. Once all the competing songs for the 2019 contest had been released, the running order for the semi-finals was decided by the show's producers rather than through another draw, so that similar songs were not placed next to each other. Slovenia performed in position 5. On 14 May 2019, the song was performed at the first semi-final and gained enough votes to quality for the final. It finished in 15th place with 105 points.

== Music video ==
The music video for "Sebi" was directed and produced by Žiga Krajnc who has previously collaborated with Kralj and Šantl on the music videos for their singles "Valovi", "Baloni" and "S teboi".

== Track listing ==
Digital download
No.	Title	Length
1.	"Sebi"	3:17

Digital download
No.	Title	Length
1.	"Sebi" (Dare to Dream Version)	3:00
2.	"Sebi" (Instrumental)	3:00

== Charts ==
Chart (2019)	Peak position
Estonia (Eesti Tipp-40)	32
Lithuania (AGATA)	33
Slovenia (SloTop50)	2
Sweden Heatseeker (Sverigetopplistan)	13
Switzerland (Schweizer Hitparade)	77

== Release history ==
Region	Date	Format	Label	Ref.
Various	16 February 2019	Digital download; streaming	Universal Music	
